= MIT Department of Electrical Engineering and Computer Science =

Academic department at the Massachusetts Institute of Technology

Coordinates: 42°21′40.2″N 71°5′32.5″W

The MIT Department of Electrical Engineering and Computer Science (EECS) is an engineering department of the Massachusetts Institute of Technology in Cambridge, Massachusetts. It offers degrees of Master of Science, Master of Engineering, Doctor of Philosophy, and Doctor of Science.

== History ==
The curriculum for the electrical engineering program was created in 1882, and was the first such program in the country. It was initially taught by the physics faculty. In 1902, the Institute set up a separate Electrical Engineering department. The department was renamed to Electrical Engineering and Computer Science in 1975, to highlight the new addition of computer science to the program.

== Current faculty ==
=== Professors ===
- Silvio Micali
- Harold Abelson
- Anant Agarwal
- Akintunde I. Akinwande
- Dimitri A. Antoniadis
- Arvind
- Arthur B. Baggeroer
- Hari Balakrishnan
- Dimitri P. Bertsekas
- Robert C. Berwick
- Duane S. Boning
- Louis D. Braida
- Rodney A. Brooks
- Vincent W. S. Chan
- Anantha P. Chandrakasan
- Shafira Goldwasser
- Pablo A. Parrilo
- L. Rafael Reif
- Jerome H. Saltzer (Sc.D. 1966)
- Kenneth N. Stevens (Sc.D. 1952)
- Gerald J. Sussman (S.B. 1968, Ph.D. 1973, both in Mathematics)
- Patrick H. Winston
- Regina Barzilay (website)

=== Associate professors ===
- Saman P. Amarasinghe
- Krste Asanovic
- Marc Baldo
- Sangeeta Bhatia
- Vladimir Bulovic
- Isaac L. Chuang
- Michael Collins
- Karl K. Berggren
- Elfar Adalsteinsson
- Tomás Palacios

=== Professors emeriti ===
- Michael Anthans
- Abraham Bers
- Amar Bose (S.B. 1951, S.M. 1952, Sc.D. 1956)
- James D. Bruce
- Fernando J. Corbató
- Shaoul Ezekiel
- Robert Fano (S.B. 1941, Sc.D. 1947)

== Former faculty ==
- Leo Beranek
- Gordon S. Brown (S.B. 1931, S.M. 1934, Ph.D. 1938)
- Vannevar Bush (Eng.D. 1916)
- Jack Dennis (S.B. 1953, S.M. 1954, Sc.D. 1958)
- Harold Edgerton (S.M. 1927, Sc.D. 1931)
- Jay Wright Forrester (S.M. 1945)
- Paul E. Gray (S.B. 1954, S.M. 1955, Ph.D. 1960)
- Irwin M. Jacobs (S.M. 1957, Sc.D. 1959)
- William B. Lenoir (S.B. 1961, S.M. 1962, Ph.D. 1965)
- John McCarthy
- Marvin Minsky
- Julius Stratton (S.B. 1923, S.M. 1926)

== Notable alumni ==
Name	S.B.	S.M.	Ph.D.	Notability
Gordon Bell	1956	1957		DEC PDP series, VAX
Manuel Blum	1959	1961		computational complexity theory 1995 Turing Award recipient
Amar Gopal Bose	1951	1952	1956	Bose wave systems Founder & Chairman of Bose Corporation
Vanu Bose	1988	1994	1999	software-defined radio Founder & Ceo of Vanu Inc.
Dan Bricklin	1973			Co-creator of VisiCalc
Wen Tsing Chow		1942		missile guidance systems
David D. Clark		1968	1973	Multics, TCP/IP
Wesley A. Clark				LINC
Peter J. Denning			1968	Multics
Bob Frankston	1970			Co-creator of VisiCalc
Cecil H. Green	1924	1924		Texas Instruments
Richard Greenblatt				Developed MacLisp and MacHack; Co-wrote the Incompatible Timesharing System and the MIT Lisp Machine; Lisp Machines, Inc.
Philip Greenspun		1993	1999	ArsDigita, ICAD
William R. Hewlett		1936		Hewlett-Packard
W. Daniel Hillis		1981	1988	Thinking Machines, Applied Minds; Clock of the Long Now; AI koans
David A. Huffman			1953	Huffman coding
Brewster Kahle	1982			WAIS, Internet Archive
Steve Kirsch	1980	1980		Invented the optical mouse
Leonard Kleinrock		1959	1963	queueing theory, ARPANET
Alan Kotok	1962	1966		Kotok-McCarthy chess program
Andrew Ng		1998		Computer Scientist, cofounder of Google Brain, adjunct professor at Stanford University, cofounder and chairman of Coursera, cofounder DeepLearning.AI, founder and CEO of Landing Ai, Artificial Intelligence, deep learning, MOOC, education technology
Ray Kurzweil	1970			Text to Speech, Speech Recognition
Daniel Levitin				Neuroscientist
John N. Little	1978			MathWorks
Robert Metcalfe	1973			Invented ethernet 3Com
Ken Olsen	1950			Invented magnetic core memory Digital Equipment Corporation
Bob Pease	1961			operational amplifiers, analog circuit design guru
Radia Perlman			1988	Spanning Tree Protocol
William Poduska	1960	1960	1962	Apollo Computer, Prime Computer
Willard Rockwell	1908			Rockwell International
Douglas T. Ross		1954		computer aided design, Whirlwind; SofTech, Inc.
Peter Samson	1963			Early electronic music research
Bob Scheifler				X Window System, Jini
Claude Shannon		1940		Information Theory
Alfred P. Sloan	1892			Chairman of General Motors
Ray Stata				Analog Devices
Guy Steele		1977	1980	Scheme, the Lambda Papers
Ivan Sutherland			1963	Sketchpad; Evans and Sutherland
Frederick Terman			1924	Founding member of the National Academy of Engineering; One of the fathers of Silicon Valley
John G. Trump			1933	Van de Graaff generator Electron beam sterilization of wastewater
Andrew Viterbi	1957	1957		Viterbi algorithm Qualcomm

== See also ==
- List of electrical engineering journals
