= T-Square (software) =

Early technical drawing program

- Original authors: Peter Samson with Alan Kotok and possibly Robert A. Saunders
- Initial release: 1962
- Platform: PDP-1
- Type: Drafting, CAD
- Website: PDP-1 Restoration Project

T-Square is an early drafting program written by Peter Samson assisted by Alan Kotok and possibly Robert A. Saunders while they were students at the Massachusetts Institute of Technology and members of the Tech Model Railroad Club.

T-Square was written for the PDP-1 computer and its Type 30 precision CRT that Digital Equipment Corporation donated to MIT in 1961. It is unlikely that many people have had the opportunity to use T-Square although Samson has said the group drew some schematics.

== Authors ==
Students of Jack Dennis and John McCarthy discovered a stunning array of uses for the very expensive room-sized computers that were given to MIT. They were privileged to be enrolled when the school's first programming courses were taught.

They negotiated with their advisors and the operations manager John McKenzie for time and became single-users long before personal computers were available. About 1959 or 1960, some of this group of students became support staff and wrote software for about $1.75 USD per hour. They wrote the programming software which is used to build application software. Later Samson and Kotok became architects of DEC computers.

== CAD ==
During this period Samson created other "firsts" in application software for music, games and page layout so it is perhaps not surprising he wrote what may be the first drafting program. Based on this experience, later in life Samson worked on an electronic drafting program with 80,000 lines of code. He received a patent in virtual reality at Autodesk, a vendor of CAD and CAM software.

== Input device ==
To move the cursor, T-Square used a Spacewar! game controller built by Kotok and Saunders in 1962. It is not known if Saunders was involved in repurposing it for T-Square. Kotok, who was about 20 years old, did participate. He was known for doing what needed to be done and for taking an interest in "all things ingenious or intriguing."

The Spacewar! control boxes were cobbled together with wood, Bakelite and toggle switches. Although they are often considered to be the first joysticks, Kotok did not accept credit for coinventing them with Saunders.

== Influence ==
A triangle used in drafting by hand. Illustration by Richard Schneider

T-Square is a small part of the reason people use today's computers for drafting, architecture, drawing and illustration and engineering. Prior to this revolution and in some places to this day, draftsmen and women used triangles, wood or metal T-squares, pencils and technical pens on film and paper. The beginning of this change can be seen in a video of Sutherland demonstrating Sketchpad.

In his 1963 MIT Ph.D. thesis, Sutherland explains he completed an early version that could draw parallel and perpendicular lines in November 1961. He goes on to say, "Somewhat before my first effort was working, Welden Clark of Bolt, Beranek and Newman..." showed him a "similar program" running on a PDP-1. T-Square and Sketchpad were developed in the same location a year or two apart but their influence on each other is unknown.

== See also ==
- Sketchpad
- T-square
