= Expensive Tape Recorder =

Computer program

- Original author(s): David Gross with Alan Kotok
- Initial release: circa 1959–1962
- Platform: TX-0
- Type: Digital audio
- Website: Tixo.org: Hacks (Internet Archive)

Expensive Tape Recorder is a digital audio program written by David Gross while a student at the Massachusetts Institute of Technology. Gross developed the idea with Alan Kotok, a fellow member of the Tech Model Railroad Club. The recorder and playback system ran in the late 1950s or early 1960s on MIT's TX-0 computer on loan from Lincoln Laboratory.

== The name ==
Gross referred to this project by this name casually in the context of Expensive Typewriter and other programs that took their names in the spirit of "Colossal Typewriter". It is unclear if the typewriters were named for the 3 million USD development cost of the TX-0. Or they could have been named for the retail price of the DEC PDP-1, a descendant of the TX-0, installed next door at MIT in 1961. The PDP-1 was one of the least expensive computers money could buy, about 120,000 in 1962 USD. The program has been referred to as a hack, perhaps in the historical sense or in the MIT hack sense. Or the term may have been applied to it in the sense of Hackers: Heroes of the Computer Revolution, a book by Steven Levy.

== The project ==
Gross recalled and very briefly described the project in a 1984 Computer Museum meeting. A person associated with the Tixo Web site spoke with Gross and Kotok, and posted the only other description known.

Alan Kotok brought an old mono FM receiver into the computer room and David Gross worked on creating a system that would take input through the A/D converter and record onto the mag tape as one long continuous record. Playback was done from the mag tape through the D/A converter for the Y-axis of the CRT (attached to the accumulator), through an oscilloscope and then to the 9-bit audio amplifier. David tells that the program had to load data in the accumulator using an XOR because anything else would clear the accumulator momentarily and produce an audible whistle. They were able to increment the X axis to produce a live display on the CRT during playback.

— Tixo.org, retrieved June 2006.

== Influence ==
According to Kotok, the project was "digital recording more than 20 years ahead of its time." In 1984, when Jack Dennis asked if they could recognize Beethoven, Computer Museum meeting minutes record the authors as saying, "It wasn't bad, considering." Digital audio pioneer Thomas Stockham worked with Dennis and like Kotok helped develop a contemporary debugger. Whether he was first influenced by Expensive Tape Recorder or more by the work of Kenneth N. Stevens is unknown.

== See also ==
- PDP-1
- Digital recording
- Expensive Typewriter
- Expensive Desk Calculator
- Expensive Planetarium
- Harmony Compiler
