= Robert Alan Saunders =

American computer scientist

- Born: September 25, 1938
- Died: April 17, 2024 (aged 85)
- Occupation: Computer scientist
- Years active: 1956–1962 (MIT) 1972-1992 (Hewlett Packard)
- Known for: Spacewar!

Robert Alan Saunders (September 25, 1938 - April 17, 2024) was an American computer scientist, most famous for his involvement with Spacewar. Saunders joined the Tech Model Railroad Club (TMRC) led by Alan Kotok, Peter Samson, and himself. They then met Marvin Minsky and other influential pioneers in what was then known as Artificial Intelligence.

== MIT: 1956–1962 ==
From 1957–61, Robert Saunders worked with other undergraduates at the Massachusetts Institute of Technology where they were allowed by Jack Dennis to develop programs for the then TX-0 experimental computer on permanent loan from Lincoln Laboratory. During these years, Saunders and his fellow TRMC members are described as the first true hackers in the book Hackers: Heroes of the Computer Revolution by Steven Levy. At MIT, Saunders earned bachelor's and master's degrees in electrical engineering. The TMRC group was heavily influenced by professors such as Jack Dennis and Uncle John McCarthy – and by their continued involvement in the student group known as Tech Model Railroad Club (TMRC).

While a graduate student, Jack Dennis (former TMRC member) introduced students to the TX-0 on loan to MIT indefinitely from Lincoln Laboratory. In the spring of 1959, McCarthy taught the first course in programming that MIT offered to freshmen.

Outside classes, Saunders, along with fellow TMRC members Alan Kotok, David Gross, Peter Samson, and Robert A. Wagner, all friends from TMRC, reserved time on the TX-0. Dennis enjoyed watching the young hackers work and allowed them to use the TX-0 for various personal projects.

In 1961, DEC donated a PDP-1 to MIT. The PDP-1 had a Type 30 precision CRT display and you could see code run while you were working. Students from TMRC worked as support staff and used this new look at programming as a way to change the way computers were used, working the Lisp programming language and a number of other innovations at the time.

== Spacewar! ==
One of these innovations was the first real digital game, called Spacewar!. Written by Saunders, Martin Graetz, Stephen Russell and Wayne Wiitanen in 1961, Spacewar! was inspired by Marvin Minsky's Three Position Display. After urging Russell to start the game for some time, the group had the first version running by early 1962, with some assistance from then DEC employee Alan Kotok. Primarily written by Russell, Spacewar! was one of the earliest interactive computer games.

During this time, Saunders built the first game controllers, thus allowing two people to play against each other without using the control switches on the front of the computer.

== Later years ==
After his years at MIT, Saunders spent most of his professional career at Hewlett-Packard, working on computer operating systems. In 1993, he went to work for five years in Riyadh, Saudi Arabia, helping to manage the computer system which deals with maintenance of the Royal Saudi Air Force's airplanes.

Saunders devised a proof of Karl Popper's conjecture on refutability, showing that the potential information content of any proposition is equivalent to its refutability. In other words, if there does not exist a means by which a proposition could be shown to be wrong, it can convey no information.

== Publications ==
=== Author ===
- The LISP System for the Q-32 Computer (Information International, Inc., May 1964)

=== Co-author ===
- The Programming Language LISP: Its Operation and Applications (Information International, Inc., March 1964)
