= Expensive Desk Calculator =

Computer program

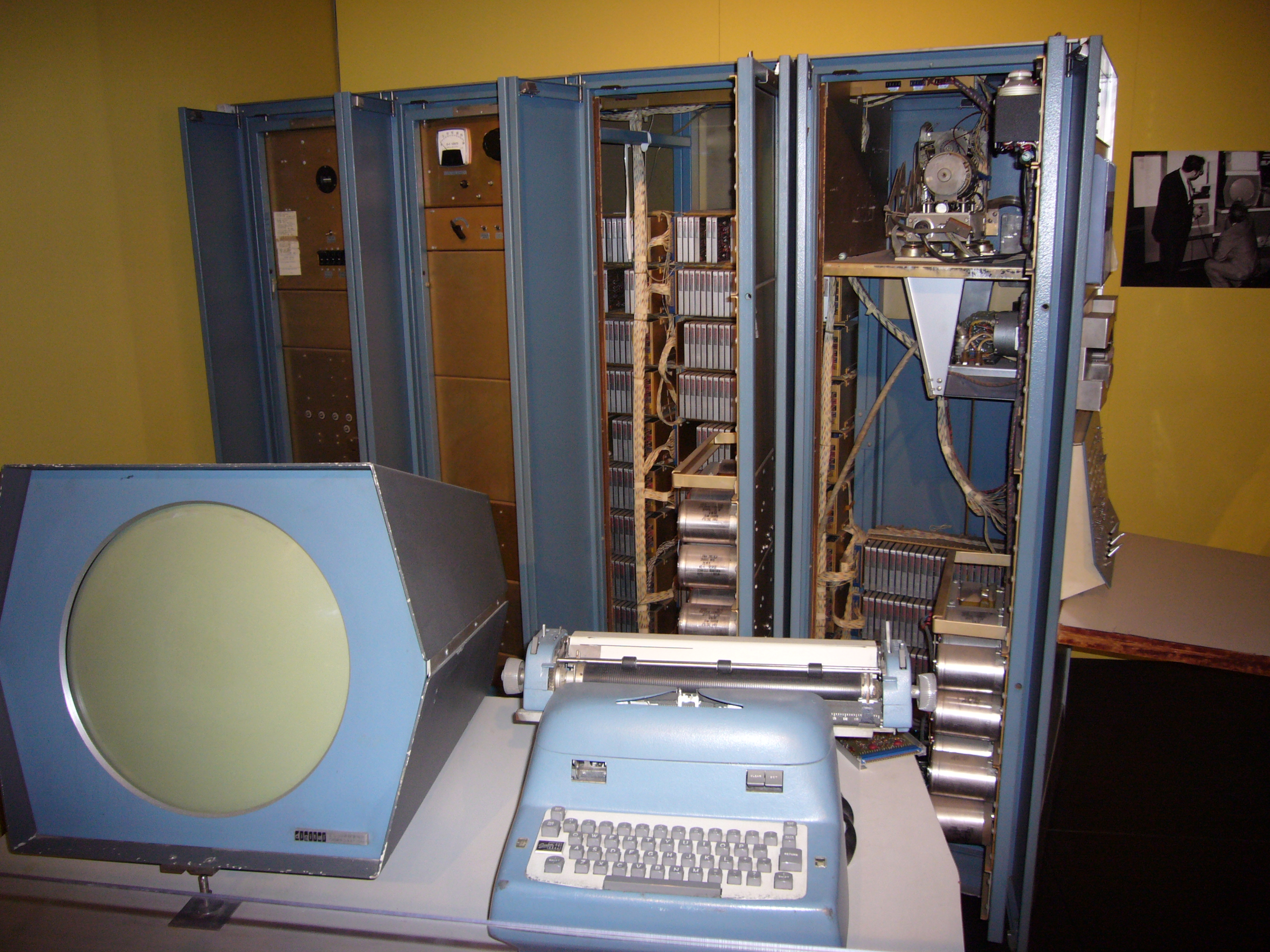
- DEC PDP-1 at the Computer History Museum
- Original author(s): Robert A. Wagner
- Initial release: 1960s
- Platform: TX-0, PDP-1
- Type: Calculator
- Website: PDP-1 Restoration Project

Expensive Desk Calculator by Robert A. Wagner is thought to be computing's first interactive calculation program.

The software first ran on the TX-0 computer loaned to the Massachusetts Institute of Technology (MIT) by Lincoln Laboratory. It was ported to the PDP-1 donated to MIT in 1961 by Digital Equipment Corporation.

Friends from the MIT Tech Model Railroad Club, Wagner and a group of fellow students had access to these room-sized machines outside classes, signing up for time during off hours. Overseen by Jack Dennis, John McKenzie and faculty advisors, they were personal computer users as early as the late 1950s.

The calculators Wagner needed to complete his numerical analysis homework were across campus and in short supply so he wrote one himself. Although the program has about three thousand lines of code and took months to write, Wagner received a grade of zero on his homework. His professor's reaction was, "You used a computer! This can't be right." Steven Levy wrote, "The professor would learn in time, as would everyone, that the world opened up by the computer was a limitless one."

== See also ==
- PDP-1
- Expensive Typewriter
- Expensive Planetarium
- Expensive Tape Recorder
