= Alan Kotok =

American computer scientist (1941–2006)

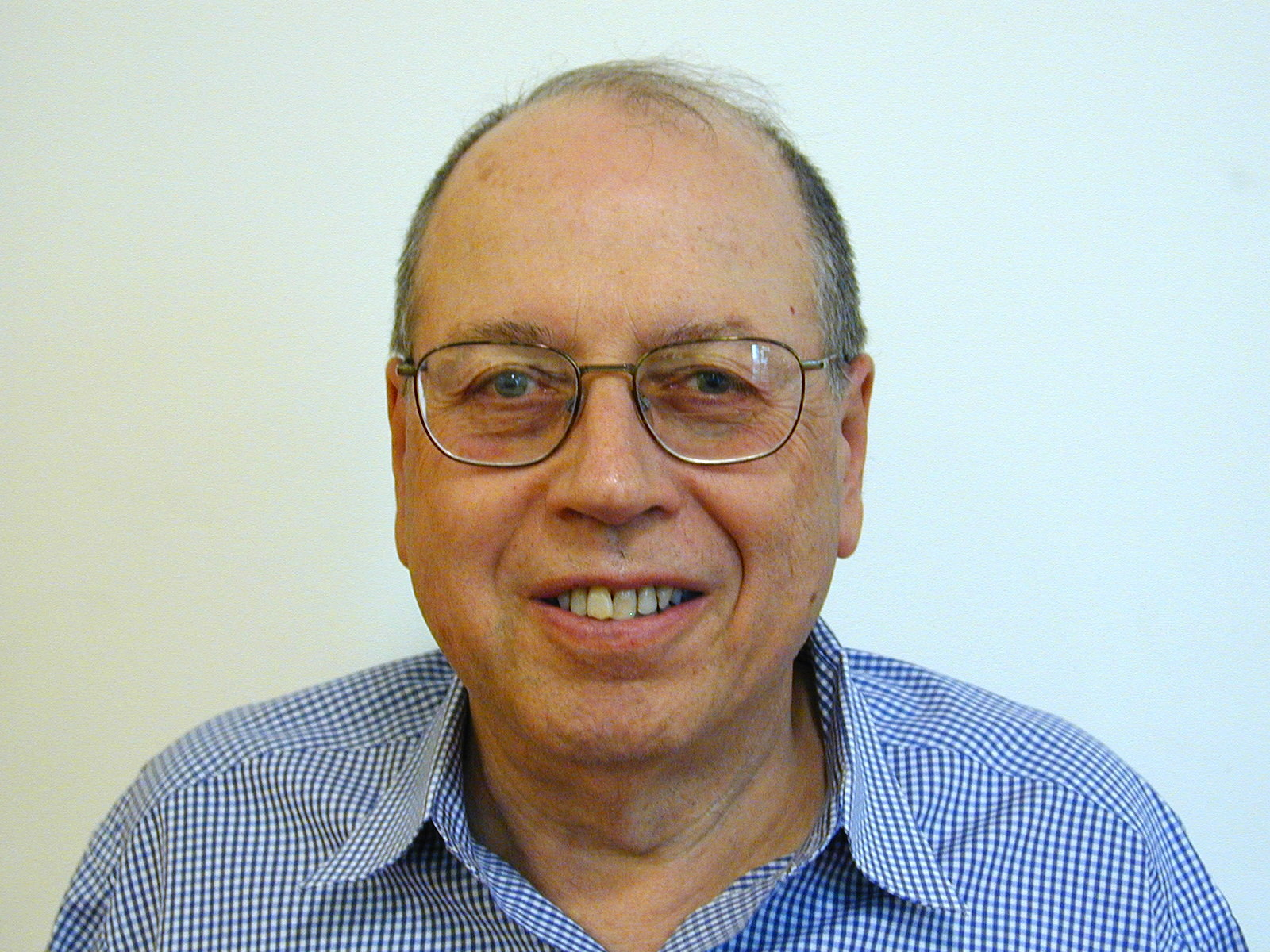
- Kotok at CSAIL in 2006
- Born: November 9, 1941; Philadelphia, Pennsylvania, U.S.
- Died: May 26, 2006 (aged 64); Cambridge, Massachusetts, U.S.
- Education: Massachusetts Institute of Technology, Clark University
- Known for: World Wide Web Consortium, Digital Equipment Corporation, Spacewar!, computer chess
- Spouse: Judith Kotok
- Scientific career
- Fields: Computer science
- Workplaces: Digital Equipment Corporation, World Wide Web Consortium

Alan Kotok (November 9, 1941 – May 26, 2006) was an American computer scientist known for his work at Digital Equipment Corporation (Digital, or DEC) and at the World Wide Web Consortium (W3C). Steven Levy, in his book Hackers: Heroes of the Computer Revolution, describes Kotok and his classmates at the Massachusetts Institute of Technology (MIT) as the first true hackers.

Kotok was a precocious child who skipped two grades before college. At MIT, he became a member of the Tech Model Railroad Club, and after enrolling in MIT's first freshman programming class, he helped develop some of the earliest computer software including a digital audio program and what is sometimes called the first video game (Spacewar!). Together with his teacher John McCarthy and other classmates, he was part of the team that wrote the Kotok-McCarthy program which took part in the first chess match between computers.

After leaving MIT, Kotok joined the computer manufacturer Digital Equipment Corporation (DEC), where he worked for over 30 years. He was the chief architect of the PDP-10 family of computers, and created the company's Internet Business Group, responsible for several forms of Web-based technology including the first popular search engine. Kotok is known for his contributions to the Internet and to the World Wide Web through his work at the World Wide Web Consortium, which he and Digital had helped to found, and where he served as associate chairman.

== Early life and education ==
Alan Kotok was born in Philadelphia, Pennsylvania, and was raised as an only child in Vineland, New Jersey. During his childhood, he played with tools in his father's hardware store and learned model railroading. He was a precocious child, skipping two grades at high school, and he matriculated at Massachusetts Institute of Technology (MIT) at the age of 16 in the fall of 1958 and an MBA from Clark University in 1978. Although his interest in computers began at Vineland High School, his first practical experience of computing came at MIT; there he developed a habit of working late at night when more computer time was available.

== MIT: 1958–62 ==
At MIT, Kotok earned bachelor's and master's degrees in electrical engineering. He was influenced by teachers such as Jack Dennis and John McCarthy and by his involvement in the student-organized Tech Model Railroad Club (TMRC), which he joined soon after starting college in 1958.

While a graduate student and member of TMRC, Dennis introduced his students to the TX-0 on loan to MIT indefinitely from Lincoln Laboratory. In the spring of 1959, McCarthy taught the first course in programming that MIT offered to freshmen. Outside classes, Kotok, David Gross, Peter Samson, Robert Alan Saunders and Robert A. Wagner, all friends from TMRC, reserved time on the TX-0. They were able to use the TX-0 as a personal, single-user tool rather than a batch processing system, thanks to Dennis, faculty advisors and John McKenzie, the operations manager.

In September 1961, Digital donated a PDP-1 to MIT. Although not an expensive machine, and with a tiny (by today's standards) 9K of memory, it had a Type 30 precision CRT display. Dennis oversaw the PDP-1 lab, located next door to the TX-0. Students from TMRC worked as support staff, programming the new computer.

=== Chess ===
From A Chess Playing Program for the IBM 7090 Computer known as Kotok-McCarthy

With classmates Elwyn Berlekamp, Michael Lieberman, Charles Niessen and Wagner, Kotok began to develop McCarthy's IBM 704 chess-playing program in 1959. Kotok described their work in the MIT Artificial Intelligence Project Memo 41. The Kotok-McCarthy chess program at MIT would also become Kotok's S.B. thesis. "The chess group" graduated in 1962 and at that point their program was able to play chess "comparable to an amateur with about 100 games experience" on an IBM 7090.

They came to learn a great deal about chess, but neither Kotok nor McCarthy were known as chess players. Mikhail Botvinnik, three times world chess champion, wrote in his book Computers, Chess and Long-Range Planning that the Kotok–McCarthy program's "rule for rejecting moves was so constituted that the machine threw the baby out with the bath water." The program drew criticism from Richard Greenblatt, who later wrote Mac Hack, which beat a person in tournament play, and more recently, from Hans Berliner, when he looked back on it in 2005. During the Cold War, Kotok-McCarthy played (and lost to) the best Soviet chess program in the first match between computer programs.

=== Spacewar! ===
A control box for Spacewar! and T-Square

Kotok contributed to one of the earliest interactive computer games, Spacewar!, and is sometimes called the first video game.

Kotok did not write any of the Spacewar! code, but he did travel to Digital to obtain a sine-cosine routine that Russell needed. Graetz credited Kotok and Saunders with building the game controllers that allowed two people to play side by side.

=== Software ===
Edward Fredkin, at one time at BBN Technologies (BBN) (Digital's first customer for the PDP-1), McCarthy, Russell, Samson, Kotok and Harlan Anderson met in May 2006 for a panel to celebrate the Computer History Museum's restoration of a PDP-1 (with Gordon Bell on tape). Their presentations illustrated the contributions of TX-0 and PDP-1 users to early software.

- Piner wrote Expensive Typewriter which enabled the group to operate the TX-0 and PDP-1 directly.
- Wagner wrote Expensive Desk Calculator.
- On a second PDP-1 in the physics department, Daniel L. Murphy wrote the Text Editor and Corrector (TECO) text editor, later used to implement Emacs.
- Samson wrote the type-justifying program known as TJ-2, an early page layout program, and implemented the War card game.
- Collaboration on computing waveforms with Dennis on the TX-0 led to Samson writing the Harmony Compiler with which PDP-1 users coded music.
- Kotok and Samson worked together on T-Square, a drafting program that used a Spacewar! controller to move the cursor.
- Gross and Kotok built the digital audio program Expensive Tape Recorder.

Early PDP-1 users wrote programming software including an assembler translated from the TX-0 over one weekend in 1961. Kotok later wrote an interpreter for the Lisp programming language in TECO macros.

Kotok and his classmates are described as the first true hackers in the book Hackers: Heroes of the Computer Revolution by Steven Levy.

== Digital: 1962–96 ==
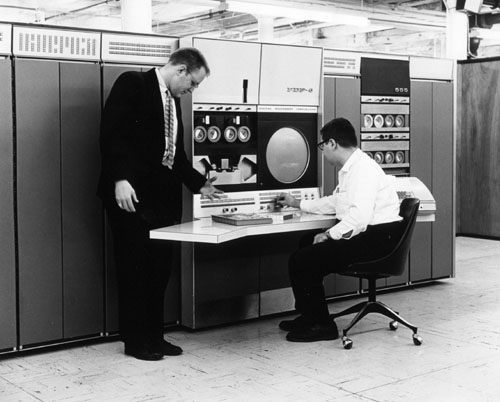
Gordon Bell and Kotok at a PDP-6 in 1964

After graduating from MIT, Kotok started at Digital Equipment Corporation as one of the company's first few dozen employees; in his 34-year career with the company, he held senior engineering positions in storage, telecommunications and software. He retired in 1996.

He began in 1962 by writing a Fortran compiler for the PDP-4, before contributing to the development of the PDP-5 instruction set. Under Harlan Anderson (vice president of engineering), principal architect Gordon Bell led a team, including Kotok as an assistant logic designer, which developed the first commercial time-sharing computer, the PDP-6, designed and delivered in 1963–1964. Aiming at a scientific market, Digital machines had a 36-bit word length to accommodate artificial intelligence work in Lisp and to compete with IBM mainframe computers. In 1965, in what may have been the first around-the-world networking connection, a PDP-6 at the University of Western Australia in Perth was operated from Boston in the United States via a telex link.

Kotok became the principal architect and designer of several generations of the PDP-10, DECsystem-10 and DECSYSTEM-20. Bell, Thomas Hastings, Richard Hill and Kotok wrote that the DECSystem-10 accelerated the transition from batch-processing to time-sharing and single-user systems. With Kotok as system architect, the VAX 8600 (known as Venus) was introduced in 1984 as the highest-performance computer in Digital's history to date, operating up to 4.2 times faster than the standard at the time. (In 1983 he briefly worked on the TX-0 again, helping to get its paper-tape reader working as it was reactivated at the Computer Museum in Boston.)

Kotok expanded his areas of expertise from engineering into teaching and business: following a suggestion of Berlekamp, he taught logic design at the University of California, Berkeley during the 1975–1976 academic year; he also earned a master's degree in business administration from Clark University in 1978, which prepared him for later work at Digital and W3C.

== Web: 1994–97 ==
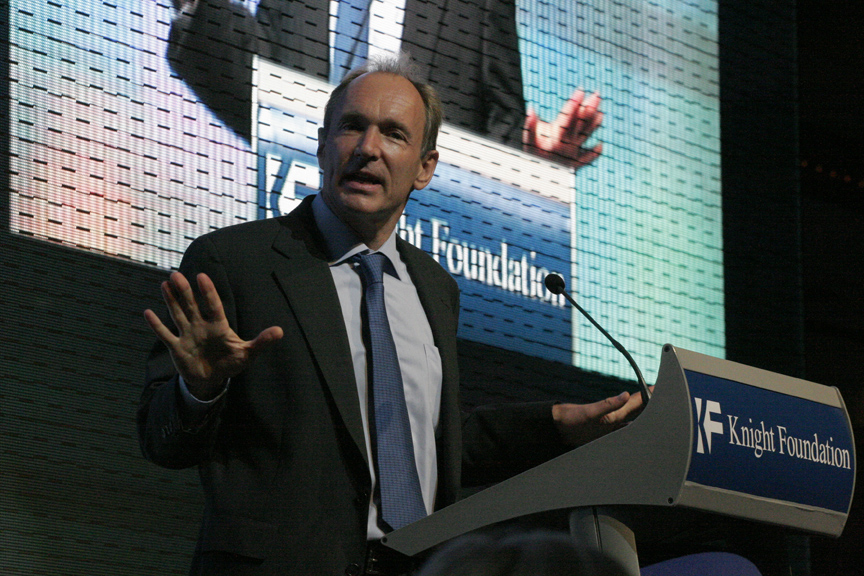
Tim Berners-Lee announcing the World Wide Web Foundation (W3F) in 2008. He mentions the 1994 meeting with Digital at CERN in his speech.

While at Digital, Kotok recognized the Web's potential, and helped to found the World Wide Web Consortium. Early in 1994, in Zürich, Switzerland, Tim Berners-Lee had met with Michael Dertouzos to discuss starting a new organization at MIT. In April 1994, Kotok, Steve Fink, Gail Grant and Brian Reid from Digital traveled to CERN in Geneva to speak with Berners-Lee about the need for a consortium to create open standards and coordinate Web development. Berners-Lee mentions the pivotal meeting with Digital in his book Weaving the Web.

As technical director of Digital's Corporate Strategy Group, Kotok was instrumental in creating the Internet Business Group which advocated early adoption and integration of Internet and Web-based technologies. Digital created the AltaVista search engine, the Internet firewall, the Web portal, the webcast and live election returns. Digital continued its lead in Internet and Web development through difficult times, but Kotok questioned a corporate strategy that he believed consumed Web and Internet resources to sell Digital products like the AlphaServer. For example, he saw a missed opportunity in Millicent, the micropayment system for buying and selling Web content for fractions of a U.S. cent.

Kotok was a corporate consulting engineer for Digital 1962–1997, W3C Advisory Committee representative for Digital 1994–1996, vice president of marketing for GC Tech Inc. 1996–1997, member of the Science Advisory Board for Cylink Corp., a consultant for Compaq, and a content advisor for the Computer History Museum.

Digital and GC Tech were early W3C members and were among the sponsors of the Fourth International World Wide Web Conference (WWW4) in 1995 in Boston. Kotok coordinated a birds of a feather meeting on Selection of Payment Vehicle for Internet Purchases on April 7, 1997, at WWW6 in Santa Clara, California. In La Jolla, California, he presented Micropayment Systems to the Electronic Payments Forum in 1997.

== W3C: 1997–2006 ==
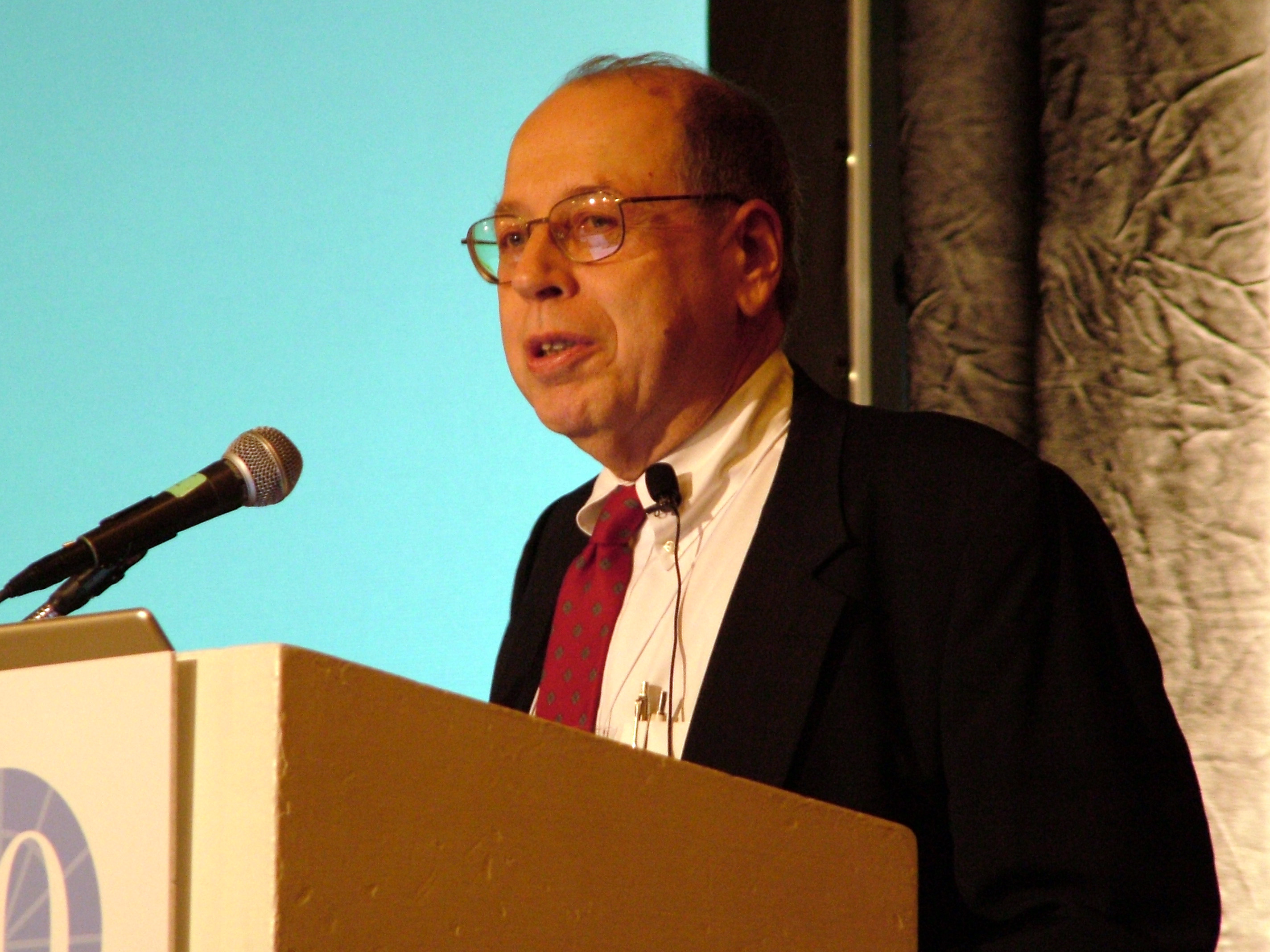
Kotok speaking in Boston in 2004

Kotok joined W3C as associate chairman in May 1997. His role involved managing contractual relations with W3C hosts and member organizations, coordinating the worldwide W3C Systems and Web Team services to millions of pages and resources on the W3C website, and maintaining the W3C host site at the MIT Computer Science and Artificial Intelligence Laboratory (CSAIL), where he was a research scientist.

While he was associate chairman, Kotok was a member of the W3C management team, and worked closely with the W3C Advisory Board. He helped to establish a new W3C office in India and worked with an internal task force to reduce membership fees in developing countries. He was a major contributor to the W3C Patent Policy and chaired Patent Advisory Groups, including one for HTML. He briefly served as Domain Leader of the Technology and Society Domain which at that time included W3C's activity in digital signatures, electronic commerce, public policy, PICS, RDF metadata, privacy, and security.

== Personal life and death ==
In 1977, at age 36, Kotok married Judith McCoy, a choir director and piano teacher on the faculty of the Longy School of Music. They lived in Harvard, Massachusetts; Cambridge, Massachusetts; and Cape May, New Jersey. The couple shared a love of 16th and 17th-century music and pipe organs, and toured historic pipe organs in Sweden, Germany, Italy and Mexico. They had a daughter, Leah Kotok, and two stepchildren from Judith's prior marriage, Frederica and Daryl Beck.

Kotok recorded an oral history at the Computer History Museum in 2004. He died at his home in Cambridge, apparently from a heart attack, on May 26, 2006, seven months after the death of his wife during her treatment for cancer. He is survived by two daughters, a son, and three grandchildren.
