= Karl Berggren =

American electrical engineer

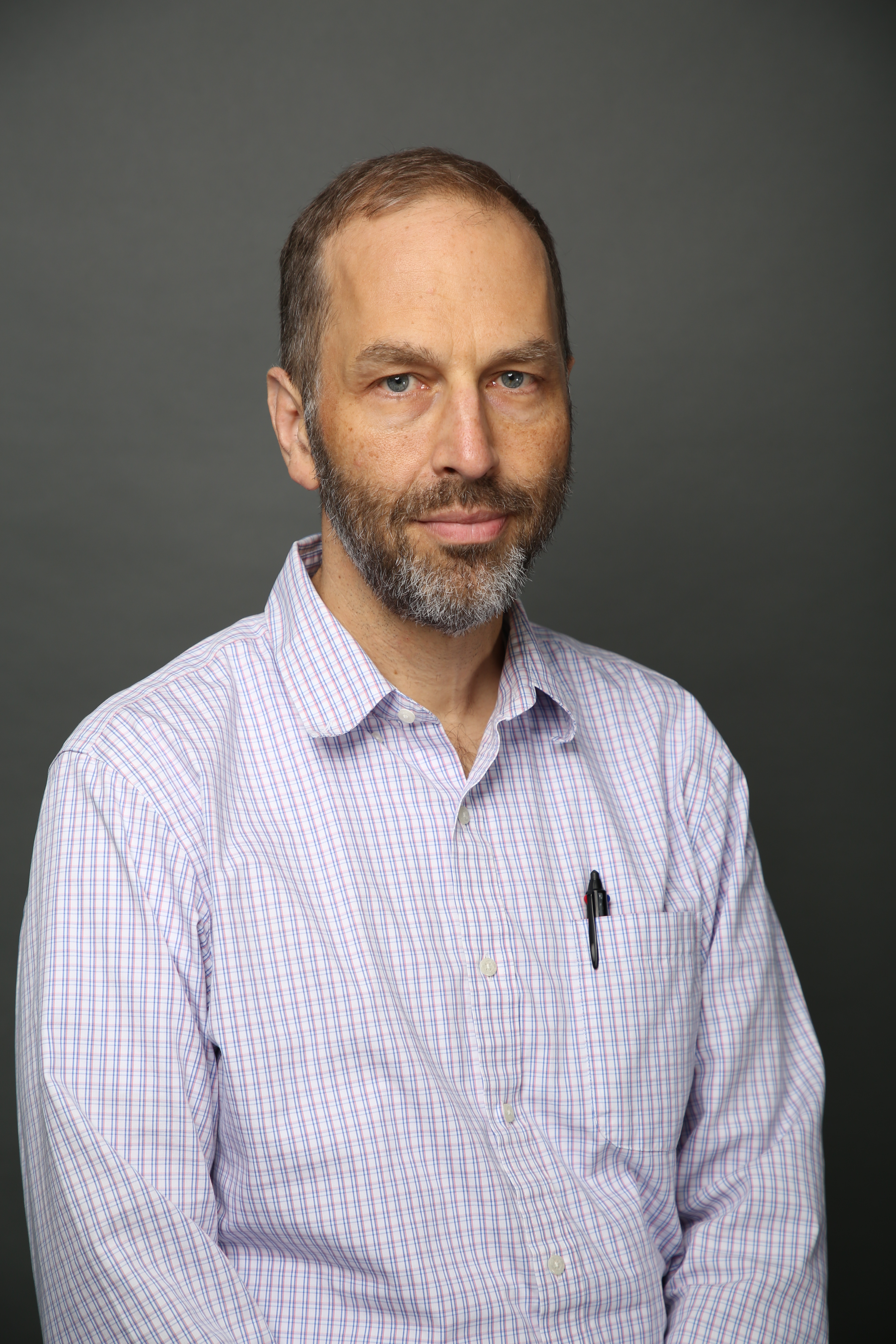
- Employer: Massachusetts Institute of Technology
- Title: Julius A. Stratton Professor in Electrical Engineering and Physics
- Website: https://qnn-rle.mit.edu/

Karl K. Berggren is the head of the electrical engineering faculty in the Department of Electrical Engineering and Computer Science at MIT. Berggren is Julius A. Stratton Professor in Electrical Engineering and Physics at the Massachusetts Institute of Technology; he was named Fellow of the Institute of Electrical and Electronics Engineers (IEEE) in 2016 for contributions to nanofabrication and nanomanufacturing in the sub-10 nm regime and Fellow of the American Association for the Advancement of Science (AAAS) in 2015.

Berggren received a Bachelor of Arts from Harvard University in 1990 and a PhD in 1997.
