= John Fitzallen Moore =

American physicist

John Fitzallen Moore (February 23, 1928 – January 31, 2018) was an American physicist, the son of authors Virginia Moore and Louis Untermeyer. His last name was legally changed after his parents' divorce. His work in military electronics, communications, and spectroscopy culminated in medical electronics and x-ray products with the founding of the company Bio-Imaging Research.

== Early life ==
After attending schools in Scottsville, Virginia and High Mowing School in Wilton, New Hampshire, Moore received a B.S. in nuclear physics from MIT in three years (where he and Walter Marvin Jr. founded the Tech Model Railroad Club in 1946), and won a National Science Foundation fellowship that led to an M.S. in solid-state physics from Harvard's School of Applied Science.

== Professional career ==
His first full-time employment was at Raytheon in Waltham, Massachusetts, where he worked on radar and telemetry. At Hycon Eastern (Cambridge, Massachusetts; later acquired by Northrop), he moved from classified missile technology to become Systems Manager of a communications design office in Bangkok, Thailand. On his return, he again worked in aircraft and missile telemetry as Director of Research and Engineering at ASCOP (Princeton, New Jersey; later a division of EMR/Schlumberger).

In 1960, he joined Lockheed Electronics in Plainfield, New Jersey, where he advanced from Manager of Operations Analysis to Scientific Advisor to the President, while contributing to "moon-bounce" communication systems and optical signal processors, and creating an infrared laboratory and corporate acquisition analysis. While there, he was appointed to the Lockheed Corporate Research Council, and also attended Columbia University in New York half-time. For the latter, his Ph.D. thesis proved experimentally that carbon dioxide in the atmosphere of Venus has enough greenhouse effect to warm its surface to the spacecraft-observed temperature of over 460 °C (860 °F).

After receiving his doctorate, Moore created new designs in spectroscopy and fluorometry as Director of Product Development at Spex Industries in Metuchen, New Jersey. In 1976 he joined EMI Medical, the inventor of X-ray CT scanning, in Northbrook, Illinois. There, he advanced to Vice-President of Engineering, and built the team that created the first CT scanner to take a picture in under 3 seconds. When EMI got out of the medical electronics business, he founded Bio-Imaging Research (Lincolnshire, Illinois). Initially, BIR created the world's first one-second CT scanner for Toshiba, and then branched into MRI, ultrasound, and industrial x-ray scanners, including the megavolt x-ray systems that inspect trucks and cargo containers at ports and border crossings. He was awarded the Chicago Area High-Tech Entrepreneur of the Year in 1987 and 1989. In 2006, he sold BIR's medical division to Toshiba Medical, and in 2007 sold its industrial and security divisions to Varian Medical Systems.

Moore served on several standards committees for medical imaging, and was Chairman of the Surface Weapons Board of the U.S. Naval Research Advisory Committee. He has published and presented numerous papers, including before the World Health Organization in Geneva. He retired after 27 years on the board of TC Manufacturing, and consulted in medical and radiation physics until dying in 2018.

== Personal life ==
He had five children (Robin [deceased], Sheila, Marjorie, Deborah [deceased], and Laurel) by his first marriage in 1948 to Joan Elizabeth Sanders (1928–1998), and two children (Jonathan M. Moore and Cris Moore) by his second marriage in 1963 to Betty-Ann Jorgensen (1938-2020). He collected original-cast musical comedy recordings and license plates, and his other interests included N-scale model railroading, mathematical games, and science fiction.

== Patents ==
Moore's patents include:

- 2,742,639 Signal comparison systems
- 2,746,032 Tracking control system
- 3,600,594 Fiber optics pulse width modulator
- 4,181,858 Adjustable compensating device for radiographic apparatus
- 4,185,195 Construction of collimators and/or detectors for penetrating radiation
- 4,222,104 Radiography
- 4,504,962 Computerized tomography
- 4,641,119 Laminar magnet for magnetic resonance device and method of making same
- 4,672,208 Particle detector crystal and related particle detector assembly
- 4,717,962 Method for compressing and reconstructing a data representation of a picture
- 4,733,082 Gamma ray camera methods and apparatus employing cooled scintillation crystal
- 4,969,165 Automatic dynamic focusing for computed tomography
- 4,984,257 Automatic dynamic focusing for computed tomography
- 4,989,225 CAT scanner with simultaneous translation and rotation of objects
- 5,010,254 System for communicating energy between relatively moving devices
- 5,661,774 Dual energy power supply
- 6,463,122 Mammography of computer tomography for imaging and therapy
- 6,683,935 Computed tomography with virtual tilt and angulation
- 6,785,357 High energy x-ray mobile cargo inspection system with penumbra collimator
- 7,133,491 Traveling x-ray inspection system with collimators
- 7,486,761 Computed tomography facilitation method and apparatus
- 8,053,745 Device and method for administering particle beam therapy

Pending:

- Method... to facilitate formation of a two-dimensional image using x-ray fan beam scatter
