= Guang Gao =

American computer scientist (1945–2021)

Guang R. Gao
- 高光荣
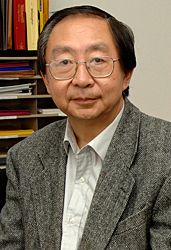
- Known for: Dataflow
- Awards: B. Ramakrishna Rau Award; ACM Fellow; IEEE Fellow
- Scientific career
- Fields: Computer architecture
- Institutions: University of Delaware
- Doctoral advisor: Jack Dennis

Guang R. Gao (1945 – 12 September 2021) was a computer scientist and a Professor of Electrical and Computer Engineering at the University of Delaware. Gao was a founder and Chief Scientist of ETI (ET International Inc., Newark, Delaware).

== Education and early life ==
Born in Tianjin in 1945 and brought up in a prominent physician family in China, Gao received a strict education from early childhood both in traditional knowledge of Chinese history and culture, as well as in western science and English. Gao has shown his strong interest and curiosity in science subjects, and attended Tsinghua University in Beijing. In January 1980, Gao left China and pursued his graduate education in the United States. He received his master's degree and PhD degree in 1982 and 1986 respectively both in Computer Science at Massachusetts Institute of Technology (MIT). Gao is the first person from mainland China who received a Computer Science PhD degree from MIT.

== Career and legacy ==
Gao begun his research career in the west as a junior faculty member at McGill University in 1987—at a time that the computer science community has a widespread doubt on the future of parallel computing in general and dataflow model of parallel computation in particular.

Gao devoted a majority of his research and academic career to carrying on the MIT dataflow model research that he participated in, and contributed to, during his PhD project under Jack Dennis and Arvind. Gao's research explores the value of the dataflow model of computation, and shows that it can be efficiently realized even in parallel computer systems that are made of classical microprocessors with von Neumann architecture and other components. To this end, Gao has led a series of parallel architecture and system projects where various aspects of dataflow models are improved and integrated in the design and implementation, ranging from innovations in programming paradigms, architecture features, system software technology, including novel program optimization and runtime system techniques. Gao's contribution was recognized by receiving the ACM Fellow and IEEE Fellow in 2007.

Gao's research focused in dataflow models, parallel computing, computer system architecture, program analysis and optimization techniques.

- Dataflow models for computation and refinement and extension
- Multithreaded programming/execution models inspired by dataflow
- Computer system architecture
- Compiler optimization models and techniques and inspired by dataflow
- Software pipelining
- Program analysis techniques

Gao's dataflow R&D work has been commercialized through ETI (ET International Inc.), a company co-founded by Gao in 2000 as a University of Delaware spinoff. Gao's team at ETI had a large role in the IBM Cyclops64 supercomputer project. For TiNY-Threads on the Cyclops64, ETI was given a Supercomputing disruptive technology award in 2007. ETI was recognized for "Sparking Economic Growth" by The Science Coalition in 2013.

Through over 30 years of R&D and effort – Gao and his students propelled the impact of MIT dataflow model of computation beyond their laboratory in the US to other parts of the world including EU and Asia.

== Awards and recognitions ==
- IEEE Computer Society Bob Rau Award: Awarded for significant contributions in the field of computer microarchitecture and compiler code generation during the 50th edition of MICRO held in Boston.
- Gauss Award: Awarded during the International Supercomputing Conference 2011 held in Hamburg, Germany for the paper "Experiments with the Fresh Breeze Tree-Based Memory Model", co-authored with Jack Dennis from MIT and Xiaoxuan Meng from the University of Delaware.
- IEEE Fellow, 2008: Awarded for his contributions in Parallel Computer Architectures and Compilers.
- ACM Fellow, 2007: Awarded for his contributions in Multiprocessor Computers and Compiler Optimization Techniques.
- China Computer Federation (CCF) Overseas Outstanding Achievement Award.
