= Kotok-McCarthy =

Early computer chess program

From A Chess Playing Program for the IBM 7090 Computer, Alan Kotok undergraduate thesis, John McCarthy advisor, MIT 1962

Kotok-McCarthy, also known as A Chess Playing Program for the IBM 7090 Computer was the first computer program to play chess convincingly. It is also remembered because it played in and lost the first chess match between two computer programs. A pseudocode of the program is in Figure 11.15 of.

== Development ==
Between 1959 and 1962, classmates Elwyn Berlekamp, Alan Kotok, Michael Lieberman, Charles Niessen and Robert A. Wagner wrote the program while students of John McCarthy at the Massachusetts Institute of Technology.

Building on Alex Bernstein's landmark 1957 program created at IBM and on IBM 704 routines by McCarthy and Paul W. Abrahams, they added alpha-beta pruning to minmax at McCarthy's suggestion to improve the plausible move generator. They wrote in Fortran and FAP on scavenged computer time. After MIT received a 7090 from IBM, a single move took five to twenty minutes. By 1962 when they graduated, the program had completed fragments of four games at a level "comparable to an amateur with about 100 games experience". Kotok, at about age 20, published their work in MIT Artificial Intelligence Memo 41 and his bachelor's thesis.

== Match with ITEP ==
In 1965, McCarthy, by then at Stanford University, visited the Soviet Union. A group using the M-2 computer at Alexander Kronrod’s laboratory at the Moscow Institute for Theoretical and Experimental Physics (ITEP) challenged him to a match. Kronrod considered Kotok-McCarthy to be the best program in the United States at the time. Although some of its faults were known in 1965 and were corrected in the Greenblatt program at MIT Project MAC, Kotok-McCarthy was no longer in development and was three years out of date.

Georgy Adelson-Velsky, Vladimir Arlazarov, Bitman, Anatoly Uskov and Alexander Zhivotovsky won the correspondence match played by telegraph over nine months in 1966-1967. The Kotok-McCarthy program lost the match by a score of three to one and the first two games were played with a weak version. The ITEP group was advised by Russian chess master Alexander R. Bitman and three-time world champion Mikhail Botvinnik. According to the Computer History Museum, McCarthy "used an improved version" in 1967 but what improvements were made is unknown.

== Influence ==
In 1967 Mac Hack VI by Richard Greenblatt with Donald E. Eastlake III became an honorary member of the United States Chess Federation when a person lost to it in tournament play in Massachusetts. Kronrod lost his directorship at ITEP and his professorship because of complaints from physics users that ITEP mathematics resources were being used for gaming. Mikhail Donskoy, Arlazarov and Uskov developed the ITEP program into Kaissa at the Institute of Control Sciences and in 1974, it became the world computer chess champion. Debate continued some forty years after the first test, about whether the Shannon Type A brute force approach, used by ITEP, is superior to the Type B selective strategy, used by Kotok-McCarthy. The success of programs such as Northwestern University's Chess 4.5, which used the Type A strategy, however, led to the Type A strategy being favored, at least for projects where playing strength, and not insight into human thought processes, was the goal. Recently, however, chess programs which make use of neural networks to evaluate positions, such as Giraffe, Alpha Chess Zero and Leela Chess Zero, make use of Monte Carlo Tree Search in order to allow a deeper search by not evaluating every position.

== See also ==
- Georgy Adelson-Velsky
- Mikhail Botvinnik
- Computer chess
