= Sketchpad =

Computer program written by Ivan Sutherland in 1963

- Ivan Sutherland demonstrating Sketchpad (UVC via IA: video and thumbnails)
- Original author: Ivan Sutherland
- Developer: MIT Lincoln Laboratory
- Release: 1963; 63 years ago
- Written in: TX-2 assembly language
- Operating system: none
- Platform: Lincoln TX-2
- Available in: English
- Type: animation, drawing, drafting, CAD

Sketchpad (a.k.a. Robot Draftsman) is a computer program written by Ivan Sutherland in 1963 in the course of his PhD thesis, for which he received the Turing Award in 1988, and the Kyoto Prize in 2012. It pioneered human–computer interaction (HCI), and is considered the ancestor of modern computer-aided design (CAD) programs and as a major breakthrough in the development of computer graphics in general. For example, Sketchpad inspired the graphical user interface (GUI) and object-oriented programming. Using the program, Sutherland showed that computer graphics could be used for both artistic and technical purposes and for demonstrating a novel method of human–computer interaction.

== History ==
See History of the graphical user interface for a more detailed discussion of GUI development.

== Software ==
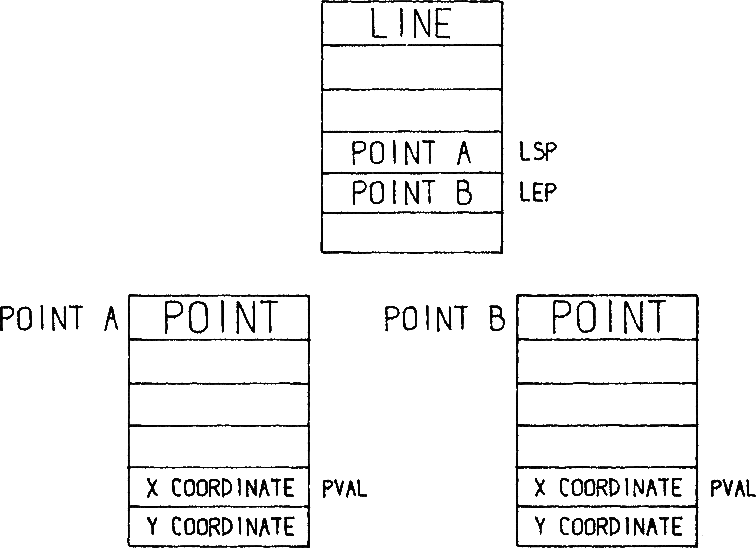
The geometric data or "N-component element" for a straight line is composed of addresses to two other N-component elements representing the end points of the line, which each contain an X and Y coordinate.

Sketchpad was the earliest program ever to use a complete graphical user interface.

The clever way the program organizes its geometric data pioneered the use of master (objects) and occurrences (instances) in computing and pointed forward to object-oriented programming. The main idea was to have master drawings which can be instantiated into many duplicates. When a master drawing is changed, then all instances change also.

This was the first known form of the Entity-Component-System model: for example instead of encapsulating points inside of a line object, the points are stored in a ring buffer as described in pages 48 to 52 of the paper, and the line only points to them. This allowed moving one point to alter all the shapes that use it in a single operation.

The structures in Sketchpad were also able to store pointers to functions, to achieve a different behavior depending on the kind of object. In figure 3.8 of the paper, the "instances generic block" stores several "subroutine entries" which are pointers to functions: "display", "howbig" etc. This was an early form of virtual functions.

Geometric constraints was another major invention in Sketchpad, letting a user easily constrain geometric properties in the drawing: for instance, the length of a line or the angle between two lines could be fixed.

As a trade magazine said, clearly Sutherland "broke new ground in 3D computer modeling and visual simulation, the basis for computer graphics and CAD/CAM". Very few programs can be called precedents for his achievements. Patrick J. Hanratty is sometimes called the "father of CAD/CAM" and wrote PRONTO, a numerical control language at General Electric in 1957, and wrote CAD software while working for General Motors beginning in 1961. Sutherland wrote in his thesis that Bolt, Beranek and Newman had a "similar program" and T-Square was developed by Peter Samson and one or more fellow MIT students in 1962, both for the PDP-1.

The Computer History Museum holds program listings for Sketchpad.

== Hardware ==
Sketchpad ran on the MIT Lincoln Laboratory TX-2 (1958) computer at the Massachusetts Institute of Technology (MIT), which had 64k of 36-bit words. The user drew on the computer monitor screen with the recently invented light pen, which relayed information on its position by computing at what time the light from the scanning cathode-ray tube screen is detected.

To configure the initial position of the light pen, the word INK was displayed on the screen, which, upon tapping, initialised the program with a white cross to continue keeping track of the pen's movement relative to its prior position. Of the 36 bits available to store each display spot in the display file, 20 gave the coordinates of that spot for the display system and the remaining 16 gave the address of the n-component element responsible for adding that spot to display.

The TX-2 was an experimental machine and the hardware changed often (on Wednesdays, according to Sutherland). By 1975, the light pen and the cathode-ray tube with which it had been used had been removed.

== Publications ==
The Sketchpad program was part and parcel of Sutherland's Ph.D. thesis at MIT and peripherally related to the Computer-Aided Design project at that time. Sketchpad: A Man-Machine Graphical Communication System.

== See also ==
- Comparison of CAD software

== Bibliography ==
- Coons, Steven (1964). Fitch, John (ed.). "Computer Sketchpad" (episode). Science Reporter. Explains basic Sketchpad principles.
- Kay, Alan (16 July 2007). Sketchpad, by Dr. Ivan Sutherland with comments by Alan Kay (video). Palo Alto, California: Xerox PARC. Archived (Flash) from the original on 18 December 2009 – via David Carroll; YouTube. Archive 2: Ghostarchive
- Kay, Alan (1987). "Pt 1". Doing with Images Makes Symbols (video presentation). University Video Communications – via Archive.
- Kay, Alan (21 February 2024). Written at London, England. Alan Kay's talk at UCLA 2024 February 21st (video). Los Angeles, California: Yoshiki Ohshima (大島芳樹). Kay narrates Sketchpad operation at 44:15–51:46 – via YouTube.
- Müller-Prove, Matthias. "Graphical User Interface of Sketchpad". Germany: MProve.
- Sutherland, Ivan Edward (1980). Sketchpad: A Man-Machine Graphical Communication System (PhD thesis). New York: Garland Publishers. ISBN 0-8240-4411-8.
- Sutherland, Ivan Edward. Sketchpad: A man-machine graphical communication system (PDF) (PhD thesis). UK: CAM. Technical Report No. 574.
- Sutherland, Ivan Edward. "Sketchpad: A Man-Machine Graphical Communication System". AFIPS conference proceedings (PhD thesis). PL: ACI. Archived from the original on 2005-04-22.
- Yares, Evan (February 2013). "50 Years of CAD". Design World: 66–71.
