= Mac Hack =

Computer chess program

Mac Hack is a computer chess program written by Richard D. Greenblatt. Also known as Mac Hac and The Greenblatt Chess Program, it was developed at the Massachusetts Institute of Technology. Mac Hack VI was the first chess program to play in human tournament conditions, the first to be granted a chess rating, and the first to win against a person in tournament play. A pseudocode for the program is given in Figure 11.16 of.

Its name comes from Project MAC ("Multi-Level Access Computer" or "Machine-Aided Cognition") a large sponsored research program located at MIT. The number VI refers to the PDP-6 machine for which it was written.

== Development ==
Greenblatt was inspired to write Mac Hack upon reading MIT Artificial Intelligence Memo 41, or a similar document describing Kotok-McCarthy, which he saw while visiting Stanford University in 1965. A good chess player, he was inspired to make improvements at MIT in 1965 and 1966.

In about 2004, he had an opportunity to tell Alan Kotok that searching the 7 best moves at each of the first two plies, and limiting the search depth to two would have done better than the default widths of "4 3 2 2 1 1 1 1", attempting eight plies in Kotok-McCarthy's REPLYS subroutine which generated each player's next plausible moves.

Greenblatt added fifty heuristics that reflected his knowledge of chess. Mac Hack was written in MIDAS macro assembly language on the PDP-6 computer DEC donated to MIT (the first working PDP-6, serial number 2). Many versions may exist. During this period the program was compiled about two hundred times.

== Tournament play ==
By the time it was published in 1969 Mac Hack had played in eighteen tournaments and hundreds of complete games. The PDP-6 became an honorary member of the Massachusetts State Chess Association and the United States Chess Federation, a requirement for playing tournaments. In 1966 the program was rated 1243 when it had taken part in the Massachusetts Amateur Championship. In 1967, the program played in four tournaments, winning three games, losing twelve, and drawing three. In 1967 Mac Hack VI defeated Ben Landy with a USCF rating of 1510 in game 3, tournament 2 of the Massachusetts State Championship.

Greenblatt published the program with Donald E. Eastlake III and Stephen D. Crocker in MIT Artificial Intelligence Memo 174 and recorded some games there.

== Influence ==
Mac Hack played by teletype, was ported to the PDP-10 and was the first computer chess program to be widely distributed. Mac Hack was the first chess computer to use a transposition table, which is a vital optimization in game tree search. Greenblatt and Tom Knight went on to advance artificial intelligence and build the Lisp machine in 1973.
