= Peter Samson =

American computer programmer

- Born: Peter R. Samson; 1941 (age 84–85); Fitchburg, Massachusetts
- Education: Massachusetts Institute of Technology
- Known for: music, Autodesk, NASA, Spacewar!, New York City Subway
- Scientific career
- Fields: computer science
- Workplaces: Autodesk, Computer History Museum, Digital Equipment Corporation, NASA, Systems Concepts

Peter R. Samson (born 1941) is an American computer scientist, best known for creating pioneering computer software for the TX-0 and PDP-1.

Samson studied at the Massachusetts Institute of Technology (MIT) between 1958 and 1963. He wrote, with characteristic wit, the first editions of the Tech Model Railroad Club (TMRC) dictionary, a predecessor to the Jargon File. He appears in Hackers: Heroes of the Computer Revolution by Steven Levy.

== Career ==
=== The Tech Model Railroad Club ===
As a member of the Tech Model Railroad Club in his student days at MIT, Samson was noted for his contributions to the Signals and Power Subcommittee, the technical side of the club. Steven Levy's Hackers: Heroes of the Computer Revolution outlines Samson's interest in trains and electronics, and his influence in the club. Levy explains how the club was in fact Samson's gateway into hacking and his ability to manipulate electronics and machine code to create computer programs. Levy explains how Samson discovered his programming passion with the IBM 704, but frustration with the high level of security around the machine. Only those with very high clearance were able to actually handle the computer, with all programs submitted to be processed through the machine by someone else. This meant Samson would not find out the results of his programs until a few days after submitting them. Because of these restrictions to the IBM 704, it was not until Samson was introduced to the TX-0 that he could explore his obsession with computer programming, as members of the Railroad Club were able to access the computer directly without having to go through a superior.

=== Dawn of software ===
Working with Jack Dennis on the TX-0 at MIT Building 26, he developed an interest in computing waveforms to synthesize music. For the PDP-1 he wrote the Harmony Compiler with which PDP-1 users coded music.

He wrote the Expensive Planetarium star display for Spacewar!.

Also for the PDP-1 he wrote TJ-2 (Type Justifying Program), the predecessor of the troff and nroff page layout programs developed at Bell Labs, a War card game, and, with Alan Kotok, T-Square, a drafting program that used a Spacewar! controller for an input device.

=== DEC ===
Samson was a contributing architect to the Digital Equipment Corporation (DEC) PDP-6, and wrote the machine's first Fortran compiler, for Fortran II.

=== Chinese ===
At Systems Concepts, he programmed the first Chinese-character digital communication system, while he was director of marketing and director of program development.

=== Synthesized music ===
Samson designed the Systems Concepts Digital Synthesizer. Built at Systems Concepts, for ten years it was the primary engine for the computer music group at Stanford University Center for Computer Research in Music and Acoustics (CCRMA).

=== NASA ===
Samson oversaw manufacturing and engineering for hardware, including the central memory subsystem for the ILLIAC IV supercomputer complex at the NASA Ames Research Center.

=== Autodesk ===
At Autodesk, he contributed to rendering, animation, Web browsing, and scripting languages. He received U.S. patents in software anti-piracy and virtual reality.

== Subway racing ==
In 1966 Samson attempted to ride all lines of the New York City Subway in the shortest possible time. True to the MIT hacker culture he enlisted a computer in planning for the event. Despite missing out on the then fastest time, Samson's attempt was to act as the inspiration for many similar subway racing attempts.

== Current ==
Samson appears in the Computer History Museum Mouse That Roared panel discussion recorded in May 2006 to celebrate the restoration of a PDP-1. For the restoration project he reverse-engineered music tapes from the PDP-1 era and built a player for the museum where he is currently a docent.
