= Richard Greenblatt (programmer) =

American computer programmer (born 1944)

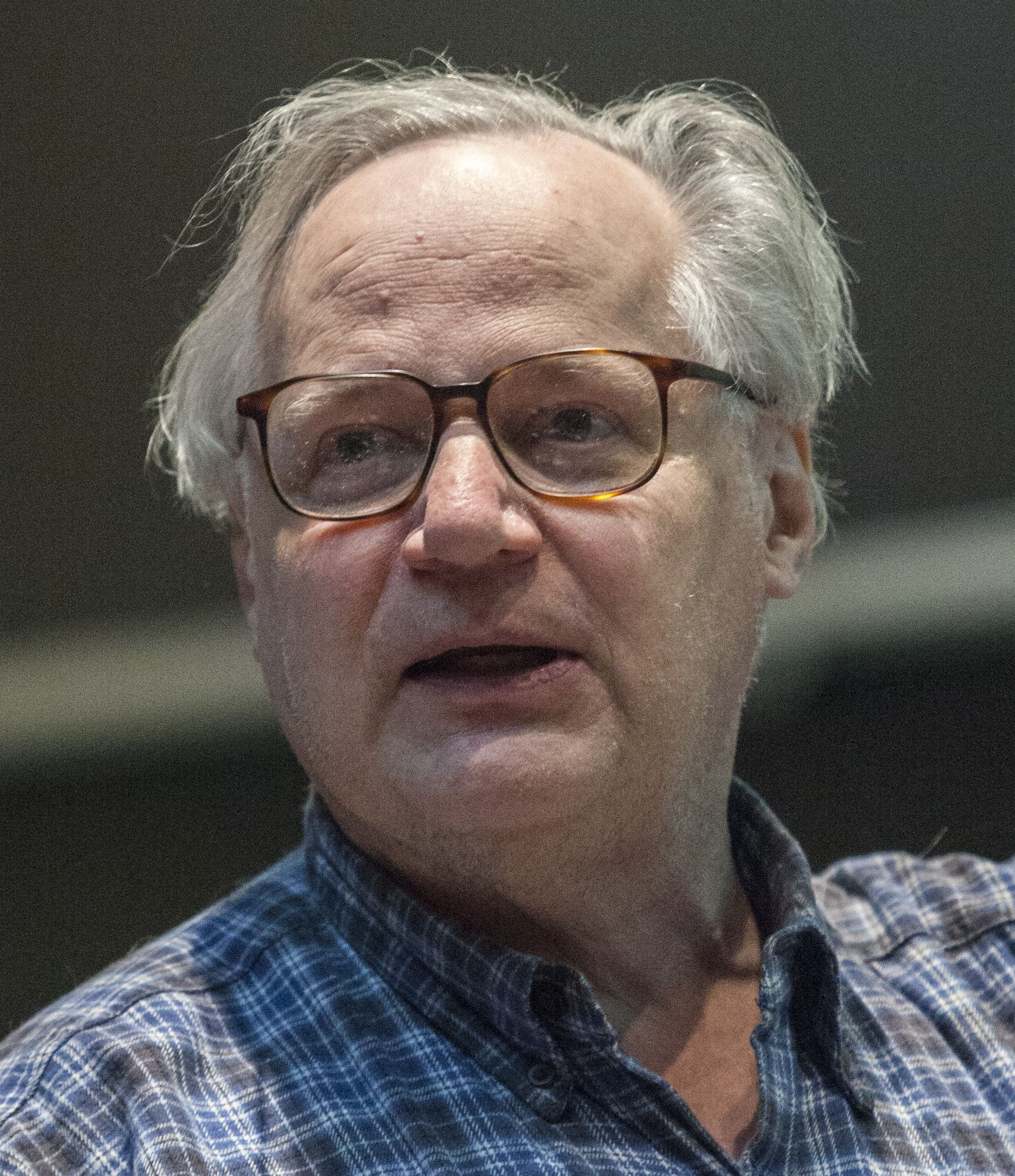
- Greenblatt in 2009
- Born: December 25, 1944 (age 81); Portland, Oregon, United States
- Education: Massachusetts Institute of Technology (MIT)
- Known for: Mac Hack chess computer; Maclisp; Transposition table; Incompatible Timesharing System
- Relatives: Aliza Greenblatt (paternal grandmother); Marjorie Guthrie (aunt)
- Scientific career
- Fields: Computer programming
- Workplaces: MIT; Lisp Machines

Richard D. Greenblatt (born December 25, 1944) is an American computer programmer. Along with Bill Gosper, he may be considered to have founded the hacker community, and holds a place of distinction in the communities of the programming language Lisp and of the Massachusetts Institute of Technology (MIT) Artificial Intelligence Laboratory.

== Early life ==
Greenblatt was born in Portland, Oregon on December 25, 1944. His family moved to Philadelphia, Pennsylvania when he was a child. He later moved to Columbia, Missouri with his mother and sister when his parents divorced.

== Career ==
=== Becoming a hacker ===
Greenblatt enrolled in MIT in the fall of 1962, and around his second term as an undergraduate student, he found his way to MIT's famous Tech Model Railroad Club. At that time, Peter Samson had written a program in Fortran for the IBM 709 series machines, to automate the tedious business of writing the intricate timetables for the Railroad Club's vast model train layout. Greenblatt felt compelled to implement a Fortran compiler for the PDP-1, which then lacked one. There was no computer time available to debug the compiler, or even to type it into the computer. Years later, elements of this compiler (combined with some ideas from fellow TMRC member Steven Piner, the author of a very early PDP-4 Fortran compiler while working for Digital Equipment Corporation) were typed in and "showed signs of life". However, the perceived need for a Fortran compiler had evaporated by then, so the compiler was not pursued further. This and other experiences at TMRC, especially the influence of Alan Kotok, who worked at DEC and was the junior partner of the design team for the PDP-6 computer, led Greenblatt to the AI Lab, where he proceeded to become a "hacker's hacker" noted for his programming acumen as described in Steven Levy's Hackers: Heroes of the Computer Revolution, and as acknowledged by Gerald Jay Sussman and Harold Abelson when they said they were fortunate to have been apprentice programmers at the feet of Bill Gosper and Richard Greenblatt.

Indeed, he spent so much time programming the Programmed Data Processor (PDP) machines there that he failed out of MIT as a first-term junior and had to take a job at a firm, Charles Adams Associates, until the AI Lab hired him about 6 months later.

=== Lisp Machines, Inc. ===
In 1979, he and Tom Knight were the main designers of the MIT Lisp machine. He founded Lisp Machines, Inc. (later renamed Gigamos Systems), according to his vision of an ideal hacker-friendly computer company, as opposed to the more commercial ideals of Symbolics.

== Significant software developed ==
He was the main implementor of Maclisp on the PDP-6. He wrote Mac Hack, the first computer program to play tournament-level chess and the first to compete in a human chess tournament. AI skeptic Hubert Dreyfus, who famously made the claim that computers would not be able to play high-quality chess, was beaten by the program, marking the start of "respectable" computer chess performances. In 1977, unbeaten chess champion Bobby Fischer played three games in Cambridge, Massachusetts against Greenblatt's computer program, and Fischer won all of them. Greenblatt, along with Tom Knight and Stewart Nelson, co-wrote the Incompatible Timesharing System (ITS), a highly influential time-sharing operating system for the PDP-6 and PDP-10 used at MIT.
