= Tech Model Railroad Club =

Student organization for hackers

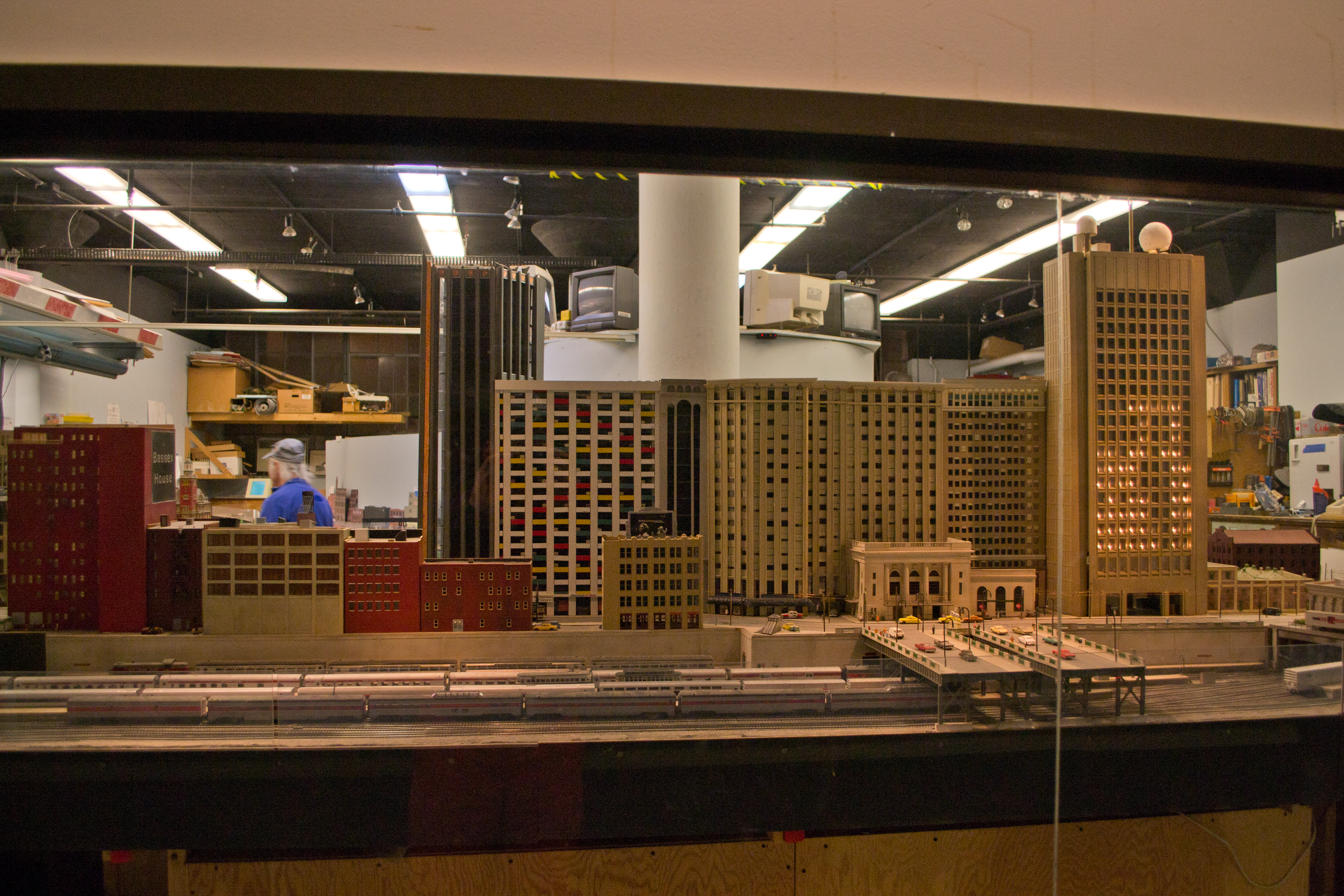
A view of the HO scale model of the Green Building at the Tech Model Railroad Club in Cambridge, Massachusetts

The Tech Model Railroad Club (TMRC) is a student organization at the Massachusetts Institute of Technology (MIT). Historically, it has been a wellspring of hacker culture and the oldest such hacking group in North America. Formed in 1946, its HO scale layout specializes in the automated operation of model trains.

== History ==
The first meeting of the Tech Model Railroad Club was organized by John Fitzallen Moore and Walter Marvin in November 1946. Moore and Marvin had membership cards #0 and #1 and served as the first president and vice-president respectively. They then switched roles the following year.

Circa 1948, the club obtained official MIT campus space in Room 20E-214, on the third floor of Building 20, a "temporary" World War II-era structure, sometimes called "the Plywood Palace", which had been home to the MIT Radiation Lab during World War II.

The club's members, who shared a passion to find out how things worked and then to master them, were among the first hackers. Some of the key early members of the club were Jack Dennis and Peter Samson, who compiled the 1959 Dictionary of the TMRC Language and who are credited with originating the concept "Information wants to be free". The atmosphere was casual; members disliked authority. Members received a key to the room after logging 40 hours of work on the layout.

The club was composed of several groups, including those who were interested in building and painting replicas of certain trains with historical and emotional values, those that wanted to do scenery and buildings, those that wanted to run trains on schedules, and those composing the "Signals and Power Subcommittee" who created the circuits that made the trains run. This last group would be among the ones who popularized the term "hacker" among many other slang terms and who eventually moved on to computers and programming. They were initially drawn to the IBM 704, the multimillion-dollar mainframe that was operated in Building 26, but access to and time on the mainframe was restricted to more important people. The group really became intensively involved with computers when Jack Dennis, a former member who had by then joined the MIT Electrical Engineering faculty, introduced them to the TX-0, a $3,000,000 computer on long-term loan from Lincoln Laboratory.

At the club itself, a semi-automatic control system based on telephone relays was installed by the mid-1950s. It was called the ARRC (Automatic Railroad Running Computer). It could run a train over the entire set of track, in both directions without manual intervention, throwing switches and powering tracks ahead of the train. A mainframe program was used to compute the path, and all modifications to the layout had to be compatible with this ability. It was sometimes used to clean the tracks with a track scraper car. Sometime around 1964, this was replaced by a second system built around the Number 5 Crossbar telephone switch; the lead designer for this project was Alan Kotok, a prominent member of the design staff at Digital Equipment Corporation (DEC). Equipment for this effort was donated by the telephone company via the Western Electric College Gift Plan. An extension to the basic control system allowed TMRC engineers to control switches on the layout. There was also a digital clock display with relay switching, and an internal telephone system with external tie-lines, all built from telephone stepping switches and relays.

The system of telephones was used for voice communication, for control of the clock, as well as for control of switches and blocks. Additionally, "j trains" (imaginary trains) could be run by plugs in the control system.

Around 1970, Digital Equipment Corporation donated two small rackmount PDP-11 minicomputers. One was eventually used to operate the club's major freight yard, and the other was set up to perform user interface tasks, such as the initial assignment of trains to throttles, and to throw turnouts. The computer replaced the keypad unit from an old keypunch machine, which had been originally installed by Richard Greenblatt.

== Vocabulary and neologisms ==
The TMRC spawned a unique vocabulary. Compiled in the TMRC Dictionary, it included terms that later became part of the hacker's Jargon File, such as "foo", "mung", and "frob". Other substitutions include "orifice" for office (as in later Back Orifice), "cruft" for garbage, and "hack", meaning an elaborate college prank carried out by MIT students. This last definition is the basis for the term "hacker".

== System layout ==
By 1962, the TMRC layout was already a complex electromechanical system, controlled by about 1200 relays. There were scram switches located at numerous places around the room that could be pressed to shut down all movement on the tracks if something undesirable was about to occur, such as a train going full speed toward an obstruction. Another feature of the system was a relay-logic digital clock (dubbed the "digital crock") on the dispatch board, which was itself something of a wonder in the days before cheap LEDs and seven-segment displays. When someone hits a scram switch, the clock stops and the time display is replaced with the word "FOO". At TMRC, the scram switches are therefore called "foo switches".

The layout is set in the 1950s, when railroads operated steam and diesel-electric engines side by side. This allows visitors to run a wide variety of model rolling stock without looking too anachronistic.

In his book Hackers: Heroes of the Computer Revolution, Steven Levy gives a detailed account of those early years. TMRC's "Signals and Power Subcommittee" liked to work on the layout's relays, switches, and wires, while the "Midnight Requisitioning Committee" obtained parts independently of campus procurement rules. The Signals and Power Subcommittee included most of the early TX-0 and PDP-1 computer hackers, and several people would later join the core of the MIT AI Lab staff. TMRC was even offered its own multi-rack-cabinet PDP-1 by 1965, although it had no space in which to install it and thus was forced to decline the gift.

MIT's Building 20, TMRC's home for 50 years, was slowly evacuated in 1996–98 and demolished in 1999 to make room for the Ray and Maria Stata Center. The club was offered a new space in Building N52, the MIT Museum building. Most of the original layout could not be moved and was demolished. Construction of a new layout began immediately and still continues. The vintage telephone crossbar relay-based control system was moved into the new space and operated for two years but, as the new layout grew, the decision was made to replace it with an electronic equivalent. Known as "System 3", this new system comprises around 40 PIC16F877 microcontrollers under the command of a Linux computer.

An unusual feature of the new layout is an HO scale model of the Green Building, an 18-story building which is the tallest structure in the academic core of the MIT campus. The model is wired with an array of incandescent window lights, which can be used as a display for playing Tetris, and was a precursor to the project to do this with the actual building. Passersby inside Building N52 can view the model through a window and play a monochromatic version of Tetris via remote control, accompanied by authentic-sounding music, even when the facility is closed. In 2011, an independent group of hackers reified this "holy grail" of hacking by installing and operating a full-sized color version of Tetris on the 295-foot (90 m) tall Green Building tower.

== Current activities ==
As of April 2015, TMRC holds a semi-annual Open House, inviting the MIT community and the general public to visit. At other times, visitors are generally welcome when members are present.

== Notable members ==
- John McCarthy
- Jack Dennis
- Peter Deutsch
- Alan Kotok
- Richard Greenblatt
- John Fitzallen Moore
- Peter Samson
- 'Slug' Russell

== See also ==
- Hacks at the Massachusetts Institute of Technology
