= Jack Dennis =

American computer scientist (1931–2026)

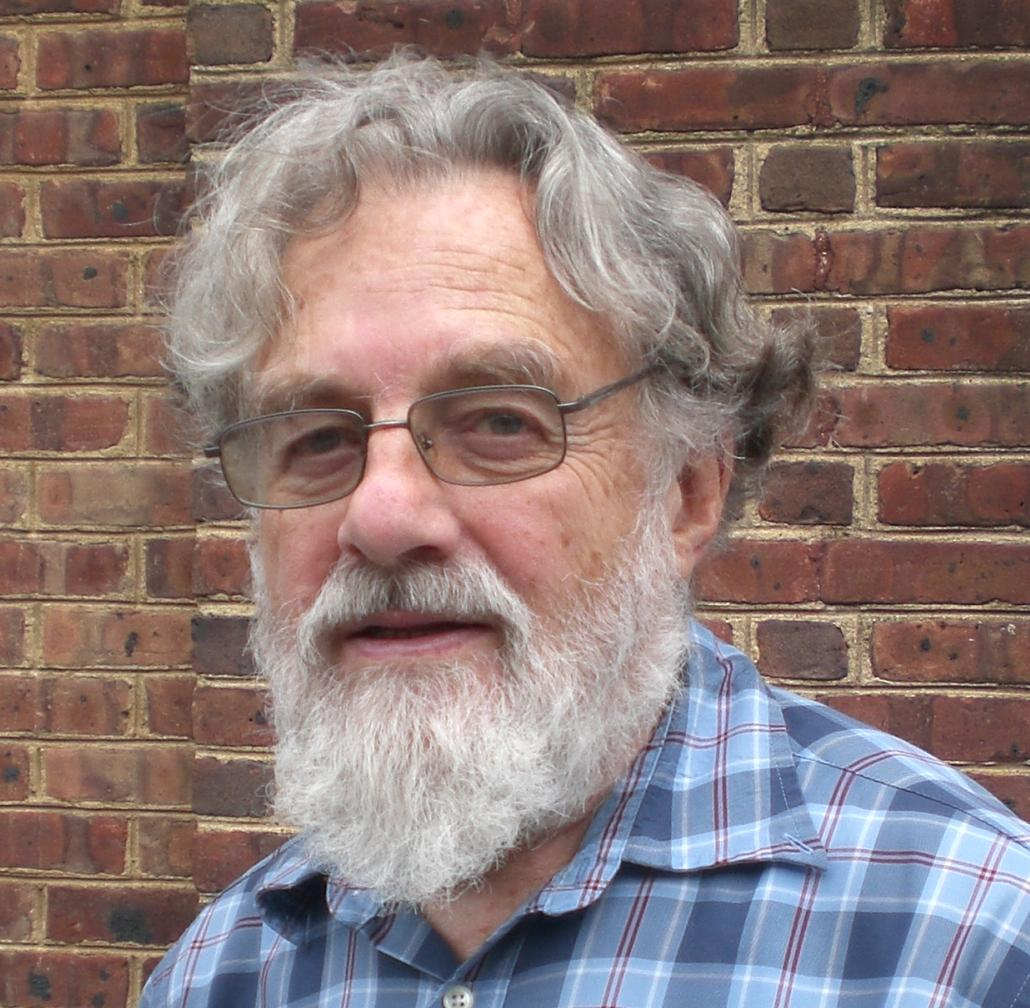
- Born: October 13, 1931; Elizabeth, New Jersey, U.S.
- Died: March 14, 2026 (aged 94)
- Education: Massachusetts Institute of Technology
- Known for: Multics
- Awards: IEEE John von Neumann Medal, Association for Computing Machinery (ACM) Special Interest Group on Operating Systems (SIGOPS) Hall of Fame, Member of the National Academy of Engineering (NAE)
- Scientific career
- Fields: Computer science
- Workplaces: MIT
- Doctoral advisor: Dean Norman Arden
- Doctoral students: Peter J. Denning; Randal Bryant; Guang Gao

Jack Bonnell Dennis (October 13, 1931 – March 14, 2026) was an American computer scientist and academic who was Emeritus Professor of Computer Science and Engineering at Massachusetts Institute of Technology.

The work of Dennis in computer systems and computer languages is recognized to have played a key role in hacker culture. As a Massachusetts Institute of Technology faculty member, he sponsored easier access to computer facilities at MIT during the early development of the subculture. Much of what would later become Unix came from his early collaboration with Dennis Ritchie and Ken Thompson. This collaboration and open philosophy live on today.

Dennis was also a member of the Tech Model Railroad Club, which incubated much of the early slang and traditions of hacking.

== Early life and education ==
Dennis was born in Elizabeth, New Jersey on October 13, 1931. He graduated from the Massachusetts Institute of Technology (MIT) as Bachelor of Science (1953), Master of Science (1954), and Doctor of Science (1958). His doctoral thesis analyzed the relation between mathematical programming problems and electrical networks. After completing his doctorate, Dennis became part of the MIT's Department of Electrical Engineering and Computer Science's faculty, being promoted to full professor in 1969.

== Career ==
As a professor at MIT, Dennis was influential in the work of student Alan Kotok and fellow professors Marvin Minsky and John McCarthy. He gave young programmers access to multi-million dollar computers and allowed them to see where their abilities could take them, inspiring a generation of MIT graduates who would shape the computer industry at DEC, Xerox Parc and ARPA. For the TX-0 computer, Dennis and fellow MIT staff member Tom Stockham created the pioneering interactive symbolic debugger FLIT in 1959.

Dennis was one of the founders of the Multics project. His most important contribution to the project was the concept of the single-level memory. Multics was not fully successful as a commercial project, but it was important because it influenced the design of many other computer operating systems, most importantly the direct inspiration for Ken Thompson (who also worked on the project) to design the first incarnation of Unix. In recognition of his work on the Multics project, Dennis was elected as IEEE Fellow.

Dennis' research at the MIT focused in Computer Theory and Computer Systems, specifically:

- Theoretical Models for Computation
- Computation Structures
- Structure of Computer Systems
- Semantic Theory for Computer Systems
- Semantics of Parallel Computation
- Computer System Architecture

Dennis also worked as an independent consultant and research scientist on projects related to parallel computer hardware and software since his retirement from MIT in 1987. He worked with the NASA Research Institute for Advanced Computer Science as visiting scientist, with the Architecture Group of Carlstedt Elektronik (Gothenburg, Sweden), and with Acorn Networks, Inc., as Chief Scientist.

A great part of Dennis' career was devoted to non-von Neumann models of computation, architecture, and languages, where programs are not attached to a program counter. Along with his students, Dennis adopted the concepts of single assignment and dataflow, in which instructions are executed as soon as data are available (this specific model is called "static" in contrast to Arvind's "dynamic").

In 2009, Dennis was elected a member of the National Academy of Engineering for contributions to sharing and protection in computer systems and parallel architectures based on data flow principles.

== Death ==
Dennis died on March 14, 2026, at the age of 94.

== Awards and recognitions ==
- IEEE John von Neumann Medal, 2013
- Association for Computing Machinery (ACM) Special Interest Group on Operating Systems (SIGOPS) Hall of Fame, 2012
- Member of the National Academy of Engineering (NAE), 2009
- Eckert-Mauchly Award, 1984
- IEEE Fellow
- ACM Fellow
