= TX-0 =

Early transistorized computer

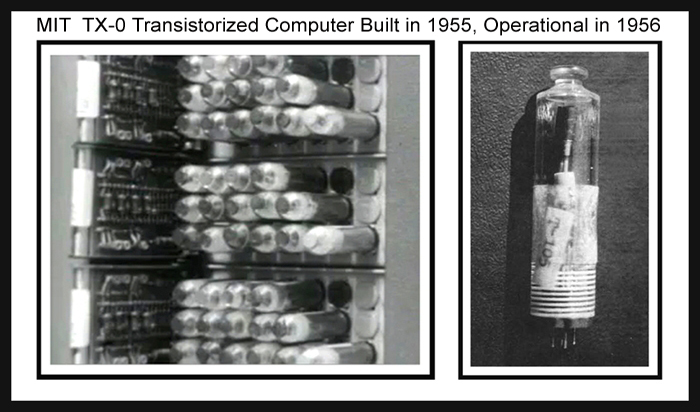
TX-0 computer circuitry used Philco surface-barrier transistors, which were encapsulated in plug-in vacuum tubes for testing and easy removal.

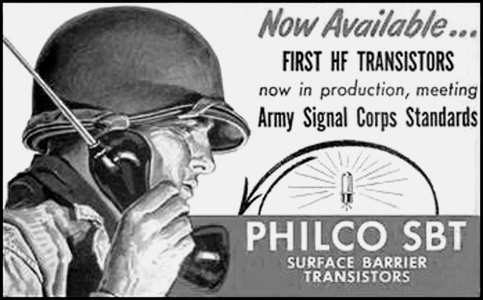
Philco surface-barrier transistor advertisement for the first high-frequency transistors, which were used in the TX-0 transistorized computer

The TX-0, for Transistorized Experimental computer zero, but affectionately referred to as tixo (pronounced "tix oh"), is an early fully transistorized computer that contained a then-huge 64K of 18-bit words of magnetic-core memory. Construction of the TX-0 began in 1955 and ended in 1956. It was used continually through the 1960s at MIT. The TX-0 incorporated around 3,600 Philco high-frequency surface-barrier transistors, the first transistor suitable for high-speed computers. The TX-0 and its direct descendant, the PDP-1, were platforms for pioneering computer research and the development of what would later be called computer "hacker" culture. For MIT, this was the first computer to provide a system console which allowed for direct interaction, as opposed to previous computers, which required the use of punched card as a primary interface for programmers debugging their programs. Members of MIT's Tech Model Railroad Club, "the very first hackers at MIT", reveled in the interactivity afforded by the console, and were recruited by Marvin Minsky to work on this and other systems used by Minsky's AI group.

== Background ==
The TX-0 was designed at the MIT Lincoln Laboratory largely as an experiment in transistorized design. Like the Whirlwind, the TX-0 was equipped with a vector display system, consisting of a 12-inch oscilloscope with a working area of 7 by 7 inches connected to the 18-bit output register of the computer, allowing it to display points and vectors with a resolution up to 512×512 screen locations.

The TX-0 was an 18-bit computer with a 16-bit address range. The first two bits of the machine word designated the instruction, and the remaining 16 bits are used to specify the memory location or operand for the special "operate" instruction. These two bits created four possible instructions, which included store, add, and conditional branch instructions as a basic set.

Wesley A. Clark designed the logic and Ken Olsen oversaw the engineering development.

== Development ==
Initially a vacuum-tube computer named TX-1 was being designed to test the first large magnetic-core memory bank. However, the design was never approved and the TX-1 was never built. Instead, the TX-0 was designed for the same purpose, except using transistors. With the successful completion of the TX-0, work turned immediately to the much larger and far more complex TX-2, completed in 1958. Since core memory was very expensive at the time, several parts of the TX-0 memory were cannibalized for the TX-2 project.

After a time, the TX-0 was no longer considered worth keeping at Lincoln Lab, and was "loaned" (semi-permanently) to the MIT Research Laboratory of Electronics (RLE) in July 1958, where it became a centerpiece of research that would eventually evolve into the MIT Artificial Intelligence Lab and the original computer hacker culture. Delivered from Lincoln Laboratory with only 4K of core, the machine no longer needed 16 bits to represent a storage address. After about a year and a half, the number of instruction bits was doubled to four, allowing a total of 16 instructions, and an index register was added. This dramatically improved programmability of the machine, but still left room for a later memory expansion to 8K (the four instruction bits and one-bit indexing flag left 13 bits for addressing). This newly modified TX-0 was used to develop a huge number of advances in computing, including speech and handwriting recognition, as well as the tools needed to work on such projects, including text editors and debuggers.

Meanwhile, the TX-2 project was running into difficulties of its own, and several team members decided to leave the project at Lincoln Lab and start their own company - Digital Equipment Corporation (DEC).

== Legacy ==
After a short time selling "lab modules" in the form of simple logic elements from the TX-2 design, the newly formed Digital Equipment Corporation (DEC) decided to produce a "cleaned up" TX-0 design, and delivered it in 1961 as the PDP-1. A year later, DEC donated the engineering prototype PDP-1 machine to MIT. It was installed in the room next to TX-0, and the two machines would run side-by-side for almost a decade. One of the TX-0 assemblers was ported to the PDP-1 over a weekend in a team effort.

TX-0 was shut down in 1976, then sold for US$450 to the then Digital Computer Museum and disassembled. It then spent about two years in storage, until its processor and console were put on display in the Computer Museum at Marlborough, Massachusetts from summer 1979 until 1981. In late 1983, the TX-0 was moved to the museum's new building in Boston, Massachusetts and restored by John A. McKenzie who had been its technician at MIT, with help from Dick Best and Alan Kotok; it was working again by November. It appears in the "Mainframes to Minis to Micros" episode of The Computer Chronicles, recording date 31 October 1983, running the "Mouse in the Maze" program.

As part of its use in artificial intelligence research, the computer was used to write simple western playlets and was featured in the 1961 CBS television documentary "The Thinking Machine", and in the companion book by John Pfeiffer of the same title published by the JB Lippincott Company in 1962.

== See also ==
- Expensive Desk Calculator
- Expensive Tape Recorder
- Early history of video games — early video games invented on the TX-0
