= SAIL (programming language) =

Dialect of the ALGOL-60 for systems programming

- Family: ALGOL
- Designed by: Dan Swinehart; Robert Sproull
- Developer: Stanford University
- First appeared: 1969; 57 years ago
- Platform: PDP-10, others

Influenced by
- ALGOL-60

Influenced
- MAINSAIL

SAIL, the Stanford Artificial Intelligence Language, was developed by Dan Swinehart and Bob Sproull of the Stanford AI Lab. It was originally a large ALGOL 60-like language for the PDP-10 and DECSYSTEM-20. The language combined the earlier PDP-6/-10 language GOGOL compiler, essentially an integer-only version of ALGOL, with the associative store from the LEAP language. The first release was in November 1969 and it saw continued development into the 1980s, including a commercial derivative, MAINSAIL.

SAIL's main feature is a symbolic data system based upon an associative store based on LEAP by Jerry Feldman and Paul Rovner. Items may be stored as unordered sets or as associations (triples). Other features include processes, procedure variables, events and interrupts, contexts, backtracking and record garbage collection. It also has block-structured macros, a coroutining facility and some new data types intended for building search trees and association lists.

== History ==
The GOGOL compiler was originally written by Bill McKeeman on the PDP-1. It was essentially an integer-only version of ALGOL-60 with a number of additions to provide direct access to the memory and other hardware to allow it to be used as a systems programming language. It reduced arrays to a single dimension, removed any ability to perform dynamic memory allocations, but did add some additional string functionality. A greatly updated version by John Sauter, GOGOL II, was written as part of a port of the underlying operating system from ODIN to THOR. When the Stanford AI Lab received their PDP-6, Sauter, Pettit and (mostly) Dan Swinehart wrote GOGOL III for the new machine.

Swinehart, joined by Robert Sproull, merged the GOGOL syntax with additions from the contemporary versions of the LEAP language to produce the first version of SAIL in November 1969. The main feature of LEAP as a language was its use of associative storage, more commonly known today as a Map or Dictionary. In LEAP, one could set the value of a field in a type using a triple, with the first entry being the variable name, the second being the field name, and the third the value.

Further improvements were added by Russell Taylor, Jim Low and Hana Samet, who added processes, procedure variables, interrupts, context, matching procedures, a new macro system, and other features. Development then passed to Taylor, John Reiser and Robert Smith, who added a debugger, a system-level print statement, records, and performed the conversion from Standord's own SUAI to TENEX. It was later ported to DEC's TOPS-10 as well, while the original TENEX version worked without modification under TOPS-20.

== Description ==
=== Basic structure and statements ===
Like many ALGOL systems, and the later Pascal, the basic structure of SAIL is based on the block, which is denoted by the code between the keywords BEGIN and END. Within a block there is further structure, with the declarations of local variables at the top, if any, and the code, or statements, following. In contrast to most dialects, SAIL allowed one to place a string after the BEGIN, like BEGIN "program", and then end the block with END "program". The compiler would use these, if entered, to check for proper bracketing. SAIL did not include the equivalent of a PROGRAM block as in Pascal, nor a main as in C, execution started with the first line of code in the outermost block.

Standard statements included IF...THEN...ELSE, FOR...STEP...UNTIL...DO, WHILE...DO for top-tested loops, WHILE...UNTIL for bottom-tested, and GOTO which used a label. The CASE was similar to switch in C, but normally used a somewhat different syntax, like CASE i OF ("Zero","One","Two");, which returns the appropriate string based on the value of i. If one wanted to test explicit values in the CASE, the values had to be in square brackets:

CASE I OF
  BEGIN
    [0] 10;
    [4] 25;
    [6][7] 50
  END;

This code will ignore values like 1 to 3, and only return a value for the listed values. Note that the last item cannot have a semicolon following.

DONE exited from a block, typically used in loops, and CONTINUE returned to the top of the block. An infinite loop was typically implemented with WHILE TRUE DO....

=== Procedure declarations ===
Procedures were implemented in a fashion similar to the C programming language, with the return type, if any, in front of the name, for instance, STRING PROCEDURE toUpper(STRING originalStr);BEGIN.... Note the uncommon use of the semicolon here, whereas Pascal would immediately follow with a block, typically a BEGIN.

In order to improve performance, SAIL added two procedure qualifiers, SIMPLE and RECURSIVE. RECURSIVE told the compiler that the procedure might call itself, and thus its local variables had to be written to the stack, not just the subroutine return information. SIMPLE did the opposite, demanding the procedure have no local variables at all, not allowing GOTO out of the function, and could not refer to enclosing procedure's variables. These directives could avoid the requirement of filling out a complete activation record, thereby improving performance. This also had the side-effect of meaning that variables declared within a procedure that was not marked RECURSIVE would not be reset between calls, acting similar to C's static.

SAIL also included the FORWARD qualifier, used to insert forward declarations, typically when two procedures call each other. RETURN worked as in C, exiting the procedure and returning to the caller, as well as optionally returning a value if the procedure uses one. Parameters passed to the procedures could be by VALUE or REFERENCE, the later allowing values to be passed back.

=== Basic data types and operators ===
The basic variable types in SAIL are integers, reals (floating point), booleans, and strings. Type conversions were automatic, so INTEGER i;i←SQRT(5); would convert the value 5 to a double as that is what SQRT requires, and then cast the result to an integer. Any of these types can be turned into an array by adding the ARRAY qualifier and placing the array bounds in brackets, for instance, REAL ARRAY weeks[1:52]);. SAIL supported 1-d and 2-d arrays.

The language used the left-arrow for assignment, ←, or the underscore on platforms that did not have Stanford ASCII. It included a number of standard functions like square root, all of the common math operators, and was otherwise similar to most ALGOL derivatives for normal programming.

Strings were manipulated using array slicing, with aStr[i TO j] returning the substring with characters from i to j, or aStr[i FOR j] which returned the substring starting at i and running for j characters. The INF(inity) keyword represented the end of the string, so one could aStr[i TO INF] to return everything from i on. String functions and operators included EQU for testing if two strings were equal, the ampersand for concatenation, LENGTH, and LOP which removes the first character from the string. There was no way to compare strings other than EQU, operators like < were defined only for numbers.

=== Records and pointers ===
The concept of records as a data type had only recently been introduced when SAIL was being written. This feature thus shows the signs of being "bolted on" to the language syntax. For instance a record structure was defined using the RECORD!CLASS statement: RECORD!CLASS person (STRING name, address; INTEGER accountnum; REAL balance). This statement worked in a fashion similar to the RECORD statement in Pascal, defining the template for the record. To create a record, one used the NEW!RECORD statement, which returned a RECORD!POINTER. Pointers were typed, and could be typed to more than one type, for instance, RECORD POINTER (person,university) rp; defines rp, a pointer to either a person or university record. Pointers could also be declared to point to ANY!CLASS. Accessing the data in a record was similarly idiosyncratic; to print the name file of a person, for instance, the syntax was PRINT(person:name[rp]);.

=== String scanner ===
In addition to basic string functionality, SAIL included a string scanner system as part of the basic language. SCAN worked on string variables, while the otherwise similar INPUT was used to scan strings being read from a file. Both used a system known as a "break table" which consisted of a set of characters that represented places to stop reading, examples include linefeeds, various whitespace, and punctuation. These tables were stored in special structures, and the system allowed only 54 of these, a number that is not explained in the documentation.

To build a new table, one first called GETBREAK which returned the next free slot in the table, or "table number". This would be followed by a SETBREAK, which took the table number, a string with the break characters, another string of "omit characters" which were simply ignored during reading (as if they were not in the string) and finally the "modes", flags that indicated how the system should work. Once set, the program could then repeatedly call SCAN or INPUT and be returned complete strings. This included a reference parameter, normally brkchar, that contained the character that caused the break, allowing one to test, for instance, for end-of-file characters. The system is conceptually similar to C's strtok functionality, which is part of stdlib as opposed to being part of the language itself as in SAIL.

=== Input/Output ===
SAIL's input/output system was based on the idea of numbered "channels" in a fashion somewhat similar to the scanner entries. To open a file, one first called GETCHAN to return a value of a free channel, and then OPENed it with various parameters to describe the file and modes of operation. RELEASE was equivalent to close. Once opened, the file could be read, subject to the scanning rules noted above, by calling INPUT and looking for the end-of-file. Files did not have names as part of the OPEN, instead, LOOKUP could be used to point a channel at a given file, ENTER made a new file associated with a channel, and RENAME allowed an existing file name to be changed. One can open an existing file for writing using GETCHAN... OPEN... LOOKUP... ENTER.

There were numerous special handlers and variables that were used during I/O. For instance, the INCHWL function was an INPUT hard-wired to the user terminal and always open, and it returns its break character in the system variable !SKIP!. The PRINT function normally output to the same terminal channel, but could also be directed at any other opened channel.

=== Compiler directives ===
As a systems programming language, performance was important and to help with this, SAIL included a DEFINE which used string-replacement in a fashion similar to C's #define macros. A difference was that the delimiters around the substitution had to be defined, for instance REQUIRE "[][]" DELIMITERS;DEFINE maxSize=[100];. One common use of these macros was to define character constants like CRLF, as these were not part of the basic language. Another was to redefine the COMMENT statement to the shorter !.

The system also included a conditional compilation system using statements, as opposed to pre-processor directives as found in C. IFCR would compile the blocks between the corresponding THENC and ELSEC or ENDC. The condition in the IFCR must be known at compile time, so, like C, was normally a DEFINEd value.

=== LEAP data ===
The main difference between SAIL and other ALGOL-derived languages was its inclusion of the associative store from the LEAP language. This system provided a system that allowed data to be placed in record-like structures and then saved, retrieved and searched. In this respect it was similar to the data handling features in COBOL. The basis for the store was the association or triple, which allowed a data value to be associated with a named slot in a record. For instance, one might make a record of the type Family_Member with Name "Tom" and set the Father field to "Harry". This results in a triple of the form (Father, Tom, Harry). The associated libraries could then find all the Family_Members with "Harry" as the Father, perhaps returning "Tom" and "Alice".

== Example ==
The following code, found in the Tutorial, converts an input string to upper case.

STRING PROCEDURE upper(STRING rawstring);
  BEGIN "upper"
   STRING tmp;
   INTEGER char;
   tmp←NULL;
   WHILE LENGTH(rawstring) DO
     BEGIN
       char←LOP(rawstring); COMMENT LOP returns the first character and moves the pointer past it
       tmp←tmp&(IF "a" LEQ char LEQ "z" THEN char-'40 ELSE char);
     END;
   RETURN(tmp);
  END "upper";

== Uses ==
A number of interesting software systems were coded in SAIL, including some early versions of FTP and TeX, a document formatting system called PUB, and BRIGHT, a clinical database project sponsored by the National Institutes of Health.

In 1978, there were half a dozen different operating systems for the PDP-10: ITS (MIT), WAITS (Stanford), TOPS-10 (DEC), CMU TOPS-10 (Carnegie Mellon), TENEX (BBN), Tymcom-X (Tymshare), and TOPS-20 (DEC, based on TENEX).

SAIL was ported from WAITS to ITS so that MIT researchers could make use of software developed at Stanford University. Every port usually required the rewriting of I/O code in each application.

A machine-independent version of SAIL called MAINSAIL was developed in the late 1970s and was used to develop many eCAD design tools during the 1980s. MAINSAIL was easily portable to new processors and operating systems, and was still in limited use as of 2005.

== See also ==
- Stanford Extended ASCII (SEASCII)
