= SA10 =

SA10 can refer to the following:

- SA-10 Grumble, the NATO reporting name of the S-300, a Soviet surface-to-air missile system.
- One of Systems Concepts' major products, the SA-10, was an interface which allowed PDP-10s to be connected to disk and tape drives designed for use with the channel interfaces of IBM mainframes.
- Casio SA-10 a Casiotone.
- Sergio Agüero, referred to his initials and his kit number.
- SA-10, the tenth and final Saturn I launch vehicle. It was launched in AS-105, a NASA mission as part of the Apollo program on July 30, 1965.
