= Stanford/ITS character set =

Extended ASCII character set

- Stanford/ITS character set code page layout
- Language: English
- Created by: MIT
- Definitions: RFC 734
- Classification: Extended ASCII
- Extends: US-ASCII
- Based on: SEASCII

Stanford/ITS character set is an extended ASCII character set based on SEASCII with modifications allowing compatibility with 1968 ASCII.

== Usage ==
It is used as an alternate character set of the SUPDUP protocol for terminals with %TOSAI and %TOFCI bits set. It is also recommended for TeX implementations on systems with large character sets. The default plain TeX macro package sets values B_{16} (↑) and 1_{16} (↓) as alternative character codes for superscripts and subscripts, respectively (the default being ^ and _).

The Knight keyboard is an example of a keyboard capable of inputting all of the defined characters excluding ⋅γδ±⊕◊∫, as they are mapped to ASCII commands NUL, HT, LF, FF, CR, ESC and DEL, respectively.

== Coverage ==
Each character is encoded as a single seven-bit code value. It contains all 95 printable ASCII characters along with 27 mathematical symbols and 6 Greek letters.

== Code page layout ==
Stanford/ITS character set
	0	1	2	3	4	5	6	7	8	9	A	B	C	D	E	F
0x	⋅	↓	α	β	∧	¬	∈	π	λ	γ	δ	↑	±	⊕	∞	∂
1x	⊂	⊃	∩	∪	∀	∃	⊗	⇆	←	→	≠	◊	≤	≥	≡	∨
2x	SP	!	"	#	$	%	&	'	(	)	*	+	,	-	.	/
3x	0	1	2	3	4	5	6	7	8	9	:	;	<	=	>	?
4x	@	A	B	C	D	E	F	G	H	I	J	K	L	M	N	O
5x	P	Q	R	S	T	U	V	W	X	Y	Z	[	\	]		_
6x	`	a	b	c	d	e	f	g	h	i	j	k	l	m	n	o
7x	p	q	r	s	t	u	v	w	x	y	z	{	|	}	~	∫

== See also ==
- Stanford Extended ASCII
- Incompatible Timesharing System
- SUPDUP
- TeX
