= Foon =

Foon may refer to:

== People ==
- Dennis Foon (born 1951), Canadian playwright and novelist
- Meng Foon (born c. 1959), New Zealand politician
- Rebecca Foon (born 1978), Canadian cellist and vocalist

== Other ==
- Foon, an alternative term for a spork
- Foon, the fictional setting of the podcast Hello from the Magic Tavern

== See also ==
- FOON, the ICAO code for M'Vengue El Hadj Omar Bongo Ondimba International Airport
- Foonly, an American computer company
- Foon Yew High School in Johor Bahru, Malaysia
