= PDP-6 =

36-bit mainframe computer (1964–1966)

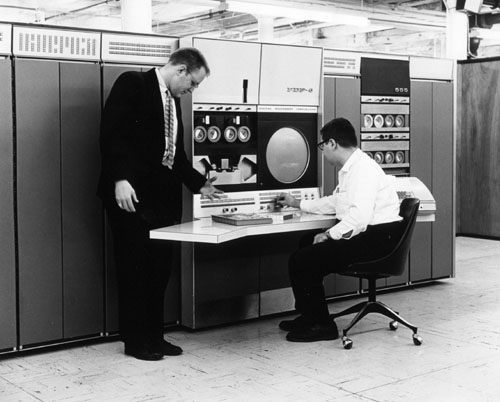
- Gordon Bell and Alan Kotok using a PDP-6 in 1964
- Developer: Digital Equipment Corporation
- Product family: Programmed Data Processor
- Type: Mainframe computer
- Released: 1964; 62 years ago
- Operating system: early version of what later became TOPS-10, custom versions of the system, ITS, WAITS
- Platform: PDP 36-bit
- Weight: 1,300 pounds (590 kg), 1,700 pounds (770 kg) with "Fast Memory"
- Successor: PDP-10

The PDP-6, short for Programmed Data Processor model 6, is a computer developed by Digital Equipment Corporation (DEC) during 1963 and first delivered in the summer of 1964. (Note: Ed Thelen puts the delivery date in June 1964.) It was an expansion of DEC's existing 18-bit systems to use a 36-bit data word, which was at that time a common word size for large machines like IBM mainframes. The system was constructed using the same germanium individual transistor-based System Module layout as DEC's earlier machines, like the PDP-1 and PDP-4.

The system was designed with real-time computing use in mind, not just batch processing as was typical for most mainframes. Using a 36-bit word with 18-bit addresses allowed it to efficiently store the cons structure found in the Lisp language, which made it particularly useful in artificial intelligence labs like Project MAC at MIT. The PDP-6 was also notable for its inclusion of floating-point instructions as a standard feature, which was relatively rare at that time. It was also complex, expensive, and unreliable as a result of its use of so many early-model transistors. Only 23 were sold, at prices ranging from $120,000 to $300,000.

The lasting influence of the PDP-6 was its re-implementation using modern silicon transistors and the newer Flip-Chip module packaging to produce the PDP-10. The instruction sets of the two machines are almost identical. The PDP-10 was less expensive and more reliable, and about 1500 were sold during its lifetime.

== History ==
DEC's first products were not computers but a series of plug-in circuits known as Digital Laboratory Modules that performed digital logic. Users could wire the modules together to perform specific tasks. DEC soon introduced the PDP-1 which was built out of large numbers of these modules, now known as System Building Blocks or System Modules.

The PDP-1 used an 18-bit word. Word lengths in the early 1960s were generally some multiple of six bits, as the character codes of the era were 6 bits long and it was also a useful size for storing binary-coded decimal digits with an optional sign, as commonly used on IBM machines of the era. Large machines generally used a 36-bit word length, but there were many variations. The PDP-1's 18-bit length allowed the machine to be simpler and less expensive than these, at US$120,000 (equivalent to $1,294,384 in 2024). Proposals for a PDP-2 and PDP-3 were turned down, and DEC's next machine, the PDP-4, was essentially a smaller and less-expensive PDP-1 that sold for roughly half the cost. The PDP-5 was built from the same components, but used a 12-bit word for even greater savings and sold for about US$27,000 (equivalent to $277,308 in 2024).

The PDP-6 was DEC's first "big" machine. It used 36-bit words, in common with other large computers at the time from companies like IBM, Honeywell and General Electric. Unlike those machines, the PDP-6 was supplied with a timesharing system "out of the box". Timesharing had been available for other machines, most famously the PDP-1 at Project MAC, but the PDP-6 was the first such system to be supported by the manufacturer.

Worldwide, only 23 PDP-6's were sold, the smallest number of any DEC machine. It was complex and expensive to build, as well as difficult to install and get operational at the customer's site. Additionally, the sales force found the PDP-6 to be a "hard sell". Nevertheless, the company later considered the PDP-6 to be a success:

Because the PDP-6 was the first computer to offer elegant, powerful capabilities at a low price, a great many of the PDP-6s built found their way into university and scientific environments, giving DEC a strong foothold in that market and providing both educated customer input for future models and a source of bright young future employees to assist in the hardware and software development for those future models.

The sales were so slow that DEC eventually decided to abandon the system and announced that they would not build any more 36-bit machines. This decision was later reversed and a new 36-bit system, program-compatible with the PDP-6, was designed using the new Flip-Chip modules and much smaller system boards to improve density and reliability. The resulting design was released in 1966 as the PDP-10. DEC describes this machine as the successor to the PDP-6. It ran roughly twice as fast as the PDP-6, and offered a wide variety of expansions and input/output options. It added batch processing features to the PDP-6's timesharing operating system. It was far more successful and eventually sold about 1,500 machines.

== Description ==
=== Architecture ===
Addressing remained 18-bit, as in earlier DEC machines, allowing for a 256 kword main memory, about 1 MB in modern terms. Memory was implemented using magnetic cores; a typical system included 32,768 words (equivalent to 144 kB on modern machines). The use of a 36-bit word allowed two 18-bit addresses to be stored in a single memory location; this made it suited to the storage of a cons, a widely used structure in the Lisp language, meaning the PDP-6 could store a cons in a single word and read and write one in a single operation.

The instruction set architecture could be categorized as "one-and-a-half address". The opcode was stored in the most significant bits of the 36-bit word, using 9 bits. The next four bits indicate which of sixteen registers to apply the instruction to. The last 18 bits indicated an address. Thus, a typical instruction might be "add the value in memory location 1234 to the value in register 4". Thus the format contains one-and-a-half addresses, the half being the register.

This left another five bits in the instruction word, bits 13 through 17. Bit 13 indicated the address was indirect; instead of the value stored in address 1234 being added to the selected register, the value in 1234 was interpreted as another address, the value in that location used. For instance, if the value in 1234 is 2345, the resulting instruction would add the value in 2345 to register 4. This sort of access pattern was common as it allowed tables to be scanned over using a single instruction and then changing the value in memory to point to another location. The remaining four bits offered a similar functionality by selecting a second register as an index register, allowing memory to be stepped through by changing the value in the fast register rather than in slower main memory.

The registers in the PDP-6 were simply the first 16 memory locations of main memory. Most, if not all, PDP-6 systems were equipped with the optional Type 162 "Fast Memory", which constructed these 16 memory locations from discrete-transistor flip-flops. These operated four times as fast as the core memory.

=== Hardware ===
The PDP-6 weighed about 1,300 pounds (590 kg), 1,700 pounds (770 kg) with "Fast Memory".

The PDP-6 was infamous because of the 6205 board, a large (11 × 9 inches) board which contained 1 bit of arithmetic register (AR), memory buffer (MB), and multiplier-quotient register (MQ). The CPU included 36 such cards. Each board had 88 transistors, a two-sided PC etch, two 18-pin and two 22-pin connectors (two on each side of the module). Because of all these connectors, swapping this module was a major undertaking, and the mechanical coupling made it highly likely that fixing one fault would cause another. There was also a great fear of powering off a PDP-6, since it would generally result in at least one 6205 board failing.

The experience with the 6205 led the designers of the first models of PDP-10, the KA10 and KI10, to use only small boards. It was not until the KL10 that large boards were used again.

=== Operating system ===
The PDP-6 supported time-sharing through the use of a status bit selecting between two operating modes ("Executive" and "User", with access to input/output (I/O), etc., being restricted in the latter), and a single relocation/protection register which allowed a user's address space to be limited to a set section of main memory (a second relocation/protection register for shareable "high segments" was added on the PDP-10). The main operating system used on the machine was an early version of what later became TOPS-10, and several sites made custom versions of the system, which was available in source code form. MIT's Incompatible Timesharing System (ITS) operating system also began on the PDP-6.

Although it was possible to time-share a PDP-6 without a disk drive, configuring it with four dual DECtape drives "could effectively support about 4-6 simultaneous users." The same (Note: 64K words) system, with a single (Note: RP02) disk drive, resulted in "real time-sharing (and) could easily handle 20-30 users."

== Museum ==
Stanford's PDP-6 was shown at DECUS in 1984. The machine was transferred to a DEC warehouse after that event. There are no records of this machine being given to the Computer Museum, which was not part of DEC in 1984. In the late 1990s Compaq donated the contents of the DEC internal archives to The Computer Museum History Center. The Fast Memory cabinet from the Stanford PDP-6 was part of that donation. There is no evidence that the modules sold at the Boston computer museum gift shop were from the Stanford PDP-6, nor is there any evidence that the museum had ever had this machine in its possession.
