= WAITS =

- Developer: Stanford Artificial Intelligence Laboratory
- OS family: DEC OS family
- Working state: Historic
- Initial release: 1967; 58 years ago
- Marketing target: Mainframe computer
- Available in: English
- Supported platforms: PDP-6, PDP-10

WAITS is a heavily modified variant of Digital Equipment Corporation's Monitor operating system (later renamed to, and better known as, "TOPS-10") for the PDP-6 and PDP-10 mainframe computers, used at the Stanford Artificial Intelligence Laboratory (SAIL) from the mid-1960s up until 1991; the mainframe computer it ran on also went by the name of "SAIL".

== Overview ==
There was never an "official" expansion of WAITS, but a common variant was "West-coast Alternative to ITS"; another variant was "Worst Acronym Invented for a Timesharing System". The name was endorsed by the SAIL community in a public vote choosing among alternatives. Two of the other contenders were SAINTS ("Stanford AI New Timesharing System") and SINNERS ("Stanford Incompatible Non-New Extensively Rewritten System"), proposed by the systems programmers. Though WAITS was less visible than ITS, there was frequent exchange of people and ideas between the two communities, and innovations pioneered at WAITS exerted enormous indirect influence.

WAITS alumni at Xerox PARC and elsewhere also played major roles in the developments that led to the Xerox Star, the Macintosh, and the SUN workstation (later sold by Sun Microsystems).

The early screen modes of Emacs, for example, were directly inspired by WAITS' "E" editor – one of a family of editors that were the first to do real-time editing, in which the editing commands were invisible and where one typed text at the point of insertion/overwriting. The modern style of multi-region windowing is said to have originated there.

The system also featured an unusual level of support for what is now called multimedia computing, allowing analog audio and video signals (including TV and radio) to be switched to programming terminals. This switching capability for terminal video even allowed users in separate offices to view and type on the same virtual terminal, or a single user to instantly switch among multiple full virtual terminals.

Also invented there were "bucky bits" - thus, the "Alt" key on the IBM PC is a WAITS legacy.

One WAITS feature very notable in pre-Web days was a news-wire search engine called NS (for News Service) that allowed WAITS hackers to instantly find, store and be notified about selected AP and New York Times news-wire stories by doing searches using arbitrary combinations of words. News story retrieval by such search was instantaneous because each story was automatically indexed by all its words when it came in over the wire.
