= Stanford Extended ASCII =

Derivation of the 7-bit ASCII character set developed in the 1970s

Stanford Extended ASCII (SEASCII) is a derivation of the 7-bit ASCII character set developed at the Stanford Artificial Intelligence Laboratory (SAIL/SU-AI) in the early 1970s. Not all symbols match ASCII.

Carnegie Mellon University, the Massachusetts Institute of Technology, and the University of Southern California also had their own modified versions of ASCII.

== Character set ==
Each character is given with a potential Unicode equivalent.

SEASCII
	0	1	2	3	4	5	6	7	8	9	A	B	C	D	E	F
0x	·	↓	α	β	∧/	¬	ε	π	λ	γ	δ	∫	±	⊕	∞	∂/∇
1x	⊂	⊃	∩	∪	∀	∃	⊗	↔	_	→	~	≠	≤	≥	≡/≍	∨
2x	SP	!	"	#	$	%	&	'	(	)	*	+	,	-	.	/
3x	0	1	2	3	4	5	6	7	8	9	:	;	<	=	>	?
4x	@	A	B	C	D	E	F	G	H	I	J	K	L	M	N	O
5x	P	Q	R	S	T	U	V	W	X	Y	Z	[	\	]	↑	←
6x	`	a	b	c	d	e	f	g	h	i	j	k	l	m	n	o
7x	p	q	r	s	t	u	v	w	x	y	z	{	|	◊	}	

Differences from ASCII

== See also ==
- Stanford Artificial Intelligence Laboratory (SAIL/SU-AI)
- Stanford Artificial Intelligence Language (SAIL)
- Stanford/ITS character set
