= Foonly =

Computer company

Foonly, Inc.
- Type: Private
- Founded: June 7, 1976; 50 years ago
- Founder: Dave W Poole
- Defunct: April 19, 1989
- Fate: Dissolved
- Headquarters: Mountain View, California, United States
- Products: Mainframes; Computer hardware Computer software

Foonly Inc. was an American computer company formed by Dave Poole in 1976, that produced a series of DEC PDP-10 compatible mainframe computers.

The first and most famous Foonly machine, the F1, was the computer used by Triple-I to create some of the computer-generated imagery in the 1982 film Tron.

== History ==
At the beginning of the 1970s, the Stanford Artificial Intelligence Laboratory (SAIL) began to study the building of a new computer to replace their DEC PDP-10 KA10, by a far more powerful machine, with a funding from Defense Advanced Research Projects Agency (DARPA). This project was named "Super-Foonly", and was developed by a team led by Phil Petit, Jack Holloway, and Dave Poole. The name itself came from FOO NLI, an error message emitted by a PDP-10 assembler at SAIL meaning "FOO is Not a Legal Identifier". In 1974, DARPA cut the funding, and a large part of the team went to DEC to develop the PDP-10 model KL10, based on the Super-Foonly.

But Dave Poole, with Phil Petit and Jack Holloway, preferred to found the Foonly Company in 1976, to try to build a series of computers based on the Super-Foonly.

During the early 1980s, after the construction of the first and only F1, Foonly built and sold some low cost DEC PDP-10 compatible machines: the F2, F4, F4B and F5.

In 1983, after the cancellation of the DEC Jupiter project, Foonly tried to propose a new F1, but it was eclipsed by Systems Concepts and their Mars project. Foonly never recovered, shutting down in 1989.

== Computers ==
=== List of models ===
Foonly F1

Design
- Manufacturer: Foonly Inc.
- Designer: Dave Poole
- Release date: 1978
- Units sold: 1
- Price: $700,000

Casing
- Weight: -
- Power: 5 kW @ 110/220V

System
- Front-end: DEC PDP-10 KA10
- Operating system: FOONEX
- CPU: 36-bit processor @ 11.1 MHz
- Memory: Up to 18 MB (4096 x 36 bits)
- MIPS: 4.5 MIPS

Model	MIPS	Word Size	Frequency	Memory	Price	Bays	Power
Foonly F1	4.5 MIPS	36 bits	11.1 MHz	18 MB	$700 000	4	5 kW
Foonly F2	0.5 MIPS	36 bits	2.8 MHz	4.5 MB	$150 000	1	0.5 kW
Foonly F4	1.4 MIPS	36 bits	8 MHz	9 MB	$300 000	1	1 kW
Foonly F4B	1.8 MIPS	36 bits	8 MHz	9 MB	$350 000	1	1.5 kW
Foonly F5	0.3 MIPS	36 bits	3.3 MHz	2.25 MB	$80 000	0.5	0.8 kW

=== The Foonly F1 ===
The Foonly F1 was the first and most powerful Foonly computer, but also the only one being built of its kind. It was based on the Super-Foonly project designs, aiming to be the fastest DEC PDP-10 compatible computer, but using emitter-coupled logic (ECL) gates rather than transistor–transistor logic (TTL), and without the extended instruction set. It was developed with the help of Triple-I, its first customer, and began operations in 1978.

The computer consisted of four cabinets:

- One for the central processing unit (CPU)
- One AMPEX for the random-access memory (RAM), with 2 MB of core memory
- A specific cabinet holding the Magic Movie Memory, a 3 MB video buffer, used especially to render movie frames
- One cabinet with tape and disk controllers, and power switches.

It was able to reach 4.5 MIPS.

The F1 is mostly famous for having been the computer behind some of the Computer-generated imagery of the Disney 1982 Tron movie, and also Looker (1981).

After that, the computer was bought by the Canadian Omnibus Computer Graphics company, and was used on some movies, such as television logos for CBC, CTV, and Global Television Network channels, opening titles for the Hockey Night in Canada programme, scanner effects for the film Star Trek III: The Search for Spock, the alien spaceship Max flying and morphing in the film Flight of the Navigator and all of the CGI effects in the TV series Captain Power and the Soldiers of the Future.

== Other models ==
Unlike the F1, the other models (F2, F4, F4B, F5) were built with the slower TTL rather than ECL circuits, and housed in a single cabinet, rather than four.

Rather than use DEC's Massbus (or other DEC buses), Foonly developed F-bus, which can work with DEC and non-DEC peripherals.

=== F2 ===
Foonly described the F2 as "a powerful mainframe at a minicomputer price," "with an average execution speed about 25% of that of the DECSYSTEM-2060."

== Peripherals ==
Standard equipment:

- Disk drives: 1–6 units, with choices of 160 MB Winchester or 300 MB removable
- Tape drives: 1–4 units, with choices of 800, 1600 & 6250 BPI

== Software ==
The Foonly machines, which could run the TENEX operating system, came with a derivative thereof, FOONEX.

== Tymshare ==
Tymshare attempted marketing the Foonly line under the name of the "Tymshare XX Series Computer Family", of which the "Tymshare System XXVI" was the main focus.

== See also ==
Other companies that produced PDP-10 compatible computers:

- Systems Concepts
- XKL
