= Stewart Nelson =

American mathematician and programmer

Stewart Nelson is an American mathematician and programmer from The Bronx who co-founded Systems Concepts.

== Biography ==
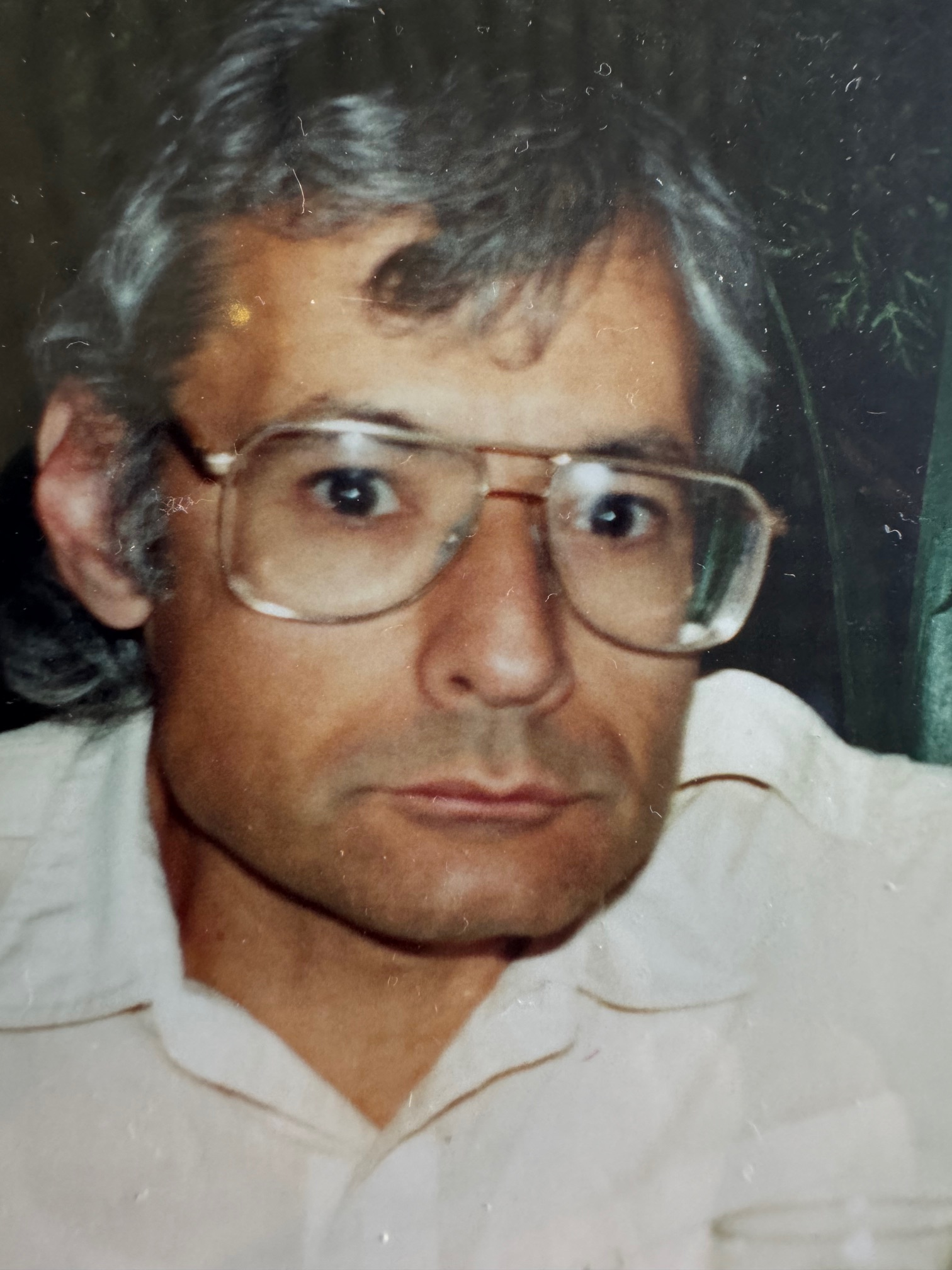
Stewart Nelson 1994

From a young age, Nelson was tinkering with electronics, aided and abetted by his father who was a physicist that had become an engineer. Stewart attended Poughkeepsie High School, graduating in the spring of 1963. From his first few days of High School, Stewart displayed his talents for hacking the international telephone trunk lines, along with an uncanny skill for picking combination locks, although this was always done as innocent entertainment. He simply loved the challenge of seeing how quickly he could accomplish this feat. His quirky sense of humor was always visible, as was his disdain for any rule that got in the way of his gaining knowledge. Stewart was an inspiration to the school's Tech-elec Club, as well as a ringleader in the founding of the school's pirate radio station.

Nelson enrolled at MIT in 1963 and quickly became known for hooking up the AI Lab's PDP-1 (and later the PDP-6) to the telephone network, making him one of the first phreakers. Nelson later accomplished other feats like hard-wiring additional instructions into the PDP-1. Nelson was hired by Ed Fredkin's Information International Inc. at the urging of Marvin Minsky to work on PDP-7 programs at the MIT Computer Science and Artificial Intelligence Laboratory.

Nelson was known as a brilliant software programmer. He was influential in LISP, the assembly instructions for the Digital Equipment Corporation PDP, and a number of other systems.

The group of young hackers was known for working on systems after hours. One night, Nelson and others decided to rewire MIT's PDP-1 as a prank. Later, Margaret Hamilton tried to use the DEC-supplied DECAL assembler on the machine and it crashed repeatedly.
