= Jupiter project =

Cancelled DEC PDP-10 successor project

The Jupiter project was the internal codename for a planned next-generation high-end successor to DEC's PDP-10 computer line. It was pursued in the late 1970s and early 1980s while DEC was also investing heavily in the VAX family.

== Background ==
By the mid-1970s, DEC faced a strategic choice between extending its 36-bit PDP-10 line and pushing ahead only with the newer 32-bit VAX architecture. Gordon Bell later described this as a prolonged internal debate over whether DEC should extend the PDP-10/PDP-6 line or the PDP-11 line, from which VAX emerged.

DEC continued PDP-10 development in part because the machine still had a strong and demanding user base. Alan Kotok later recalled that major 36-bit customers pressured Ken Olsen not to stop developing the 10 line, while David Stone recalled that the DEC-10 community gave DEC unusually direct feedback through DECUS and that, when users broadly agreed on a need, DEC generally responded to it.

Although Gordon Bell later wrote the VAX strategy after VAX's early success in 1978, he also said DEC did not immediately end PDP-10 development at that point.

== Development ==
Project Jupiter was the effort to build a next-generation PDP-10 at the same time that DEC was pursuing a new high-performance VAX implementation, Project Venus, later released as the VAX 8600. Alan Kotok recalled that the DEC version of Jupiter was to use emitter-coupled logic (ECL) gate array technology, the same technology being used by the 8600 team, and that the two projects were side by side in DEC's Marlboro facility. Gordon Bell likewise described Venus as an ECL project and said it was managed alongside the "ECL PDP-10".

Bill McBride headed the Jupiter project.

David Stone later said that what was supposed to save the DEC-10 line was a design aiming for a 15-nanosecond processor cycle, but that this target proved beyond the state of the art.

Both Project Jupiter and Project Venus ran into serious technical problems and delays. Alan Kotok recalled that by the "’77, ’79 timeframe or so" Venus was already in design review because deadlines were "slipping and slipping", with nothing yet running and not even gate-array chips sent for fabrication. Gordon Bell likewise described the 8600/Venus effort as an "absolute mess" that "got out of control".

Gordon Bell argued that Jupiter suffered because key implementation experience from earlier PDP-10 generations had been lost: Alan Kotok had stopped working on the PDP-10, "no one there was able to build a PDP-10", and the engineer leading the effort had previously worked on IBM System/360 systems, whose techniques did not transfer well to the PDP-10's very different architecture.

Gordon Bell also noted that the PDP-10's heavily sequential byte-pointer and indirect-addressing behavior made it especially awkward to redesign using those assumptions.

== Cancellation ==
Jupiter was cancelled in 1983. David Stone said DEC eventually "bit the bullet" and admitted that it did not know how to make the machine work; customers were informed and were "duly unhappy". He added that DEC then succeeded in moving many of those customers to VMS systems.

Gordon Bell later rejected the simplified claim that he had merely "killed" the PDP-10 in favor of VAX. In his account, DEC stopped the PDP-10 effort because Jupiter could not be made to work technically and because the organization no longer had the right PDP-10 implementation experience.

After Jupiter's collapse, Gordon Bell said he and others also explored licensing a TTL-based PDP-10-compatible machine from Systems Concepts in late 1982, but that effort did not lead to a DEC product.

== Legacy ==
The failure of Jupiter marked the end of DEC's attempt to produce a new in-house top-end PDP-10 successor. It also accelerated the migration of DEC's strategic focus toward VAX and VMS, even though the end of the PDP-10 line had been shaped by both business pressure and the technical failure of Jupiter itself rather than by marketing strategy alone.

Project Venus eventually did succeed after a major reset and delay, and the VAX 8600 ultimately shipped.
