= Computer Center Corporation =

Computer Time-sharing

Computer Center Corporation was a computer time-sharing company based in Washington. The company offered time-sharing on a PDP-10. Its customers included Bill Gates and Paul Allen.

Nicknamed C-Cubed, this company was founded in 1968 and closed in 1970.

== Misc ==
Two other companies, both based in New Jersey, used similar names.
