= DEC System Module =

Modules used in early PDP computers

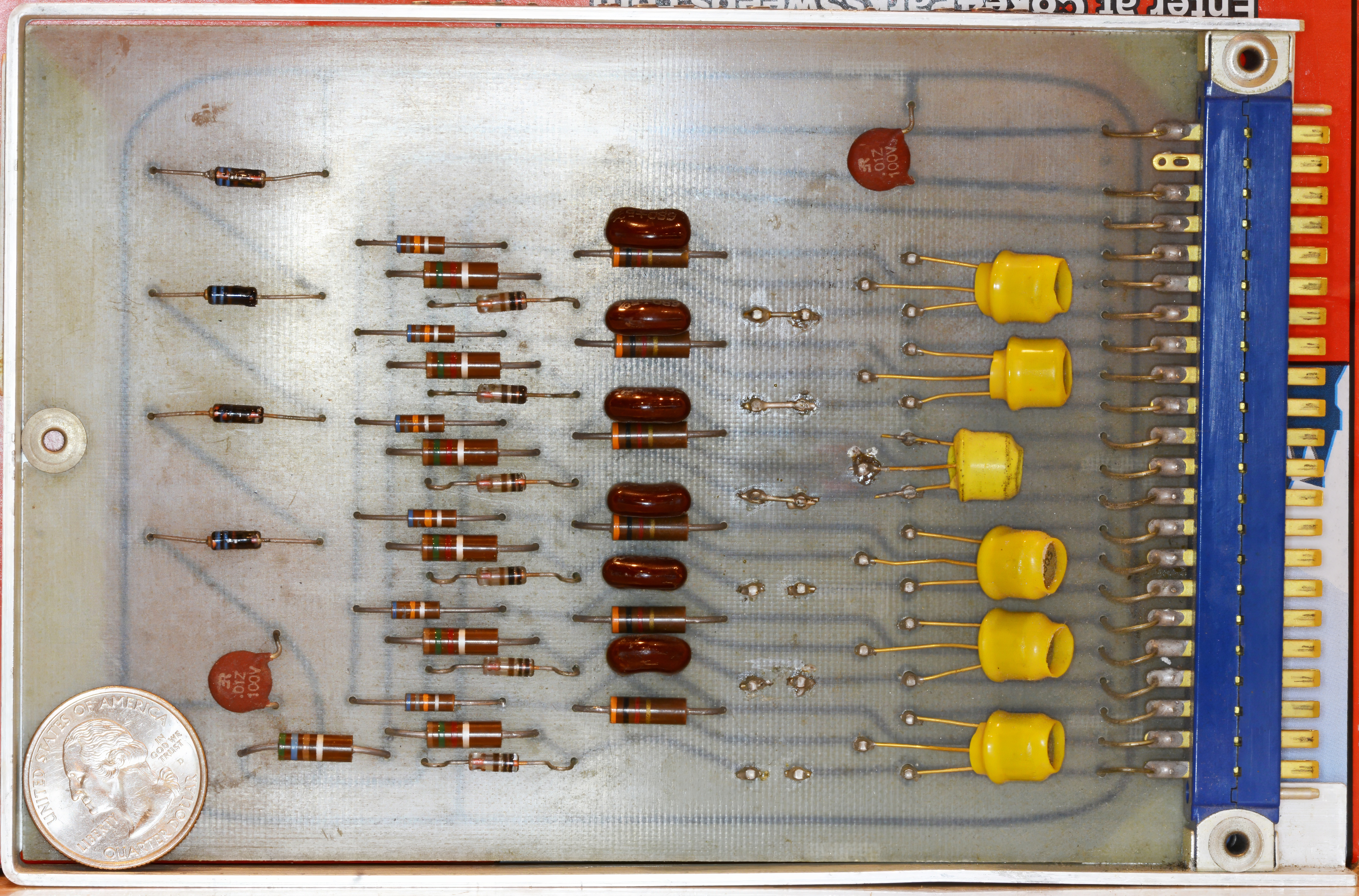
PDP-1 system module (with a replaced transistor)

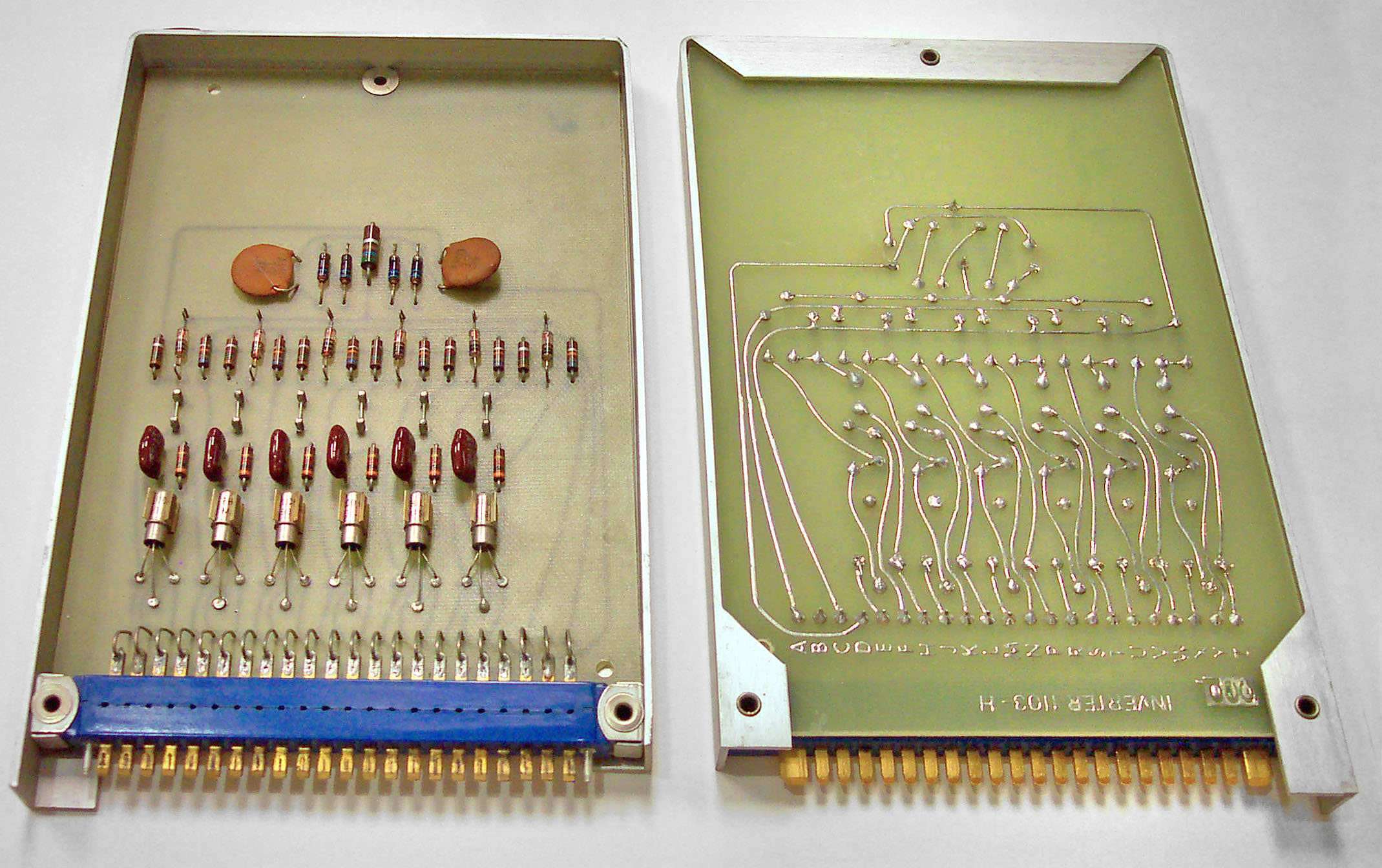
System Module 1103 hex-inverter card (both sides)

A DEC System Modules (originally known as System Building Blocks; the name was changed around 1961) are a DEC modular digital logic family which preceded FLIP CHIPs. They connect to the units they are plugged into via a set of 22 gold-plated discrete pins along one edge.

They use transistor inverter circuits, with the transistors operating saturated, to avoid dependence on tight tolerances; they use -3V and 0V as logic levels. Intended for prototyping as well as production, they include design features intended to avoid damage. They are provided with design advice which includes loading rules and wiring instructions.

They were available in several compatible speed lines:

- 4000-Series: the second series, nominally 500 KHz, but some 1 MHz
- 1000-Series: the original series, nominally 5 MHz
- 6000-Series: higher speeds, nominally 10 MHz
- 8000-Series: very high speeds, nominally 30 MHz

In addition, special modules were available for purposes such as Input/Output (I/O) converters (to standard internal voltages), bus drivers, lamp and solenoid drivers, A/D conversion, relays, drivers for core memory, etc.

Larger assemblies which are part of the same family provide devices for testing core memory. There are also power supplies, mounting panels with slots for the modules, cabinets to hold groups of mounting panels, indicator light panels, etc.

== Technical ==
Initially, System Modules were made using phenolic paper printed circuit boards. Later examples such as those illustrated here all use fiberglass-epoxy printed circuit boards.

System Modules are powered from +10 and -15 volt supplies, with logic levels of 0 and -3 volts. Saturating transistors serve as inverter-amplifiers while diodes are used for logic. The basic circuit design is similar to diode-transistor logic. When the output transistor turns on, the output is pulled up to ground. When the output transistor is off, the output is pulled down by a load resistor to -15V but held to -3 by a diode clamp. A stack of 4 forward-biased silicon diodes provides the reference voltage for this clamp.

Many modules include a jumper connection to the load resistor on the output of each gate. Omitting one of these jumpers converts the corresponding output to an open collector configuration, allowing gates to be connected in parallel for a wired logic connection. Only one of the outputs wired in parallel needs to have the load resistor connected.

Several system modules incorporate capacitor-diode gates. These are used for the AND components of AND-OR-invert gates. For example, the 4130 capacitor-diode gate or the 4205 dual flipflop. In each capacitor-diode gate, one input charges or discharges a capacitor through a resistor. If this capacitor is charged, a pulse on the second input will cross the switching threshold of the output transistor, while if the capacitor is discharged, the pulse will have no effect. Using capacitor-diode gates instead of multiple layers of nor gates reduces the transistor count, an important consideration in an era when transistors were still fairly expensive.

The use of pulses with capacitor-diode gates was simplified by designing around a standard pulse waveform. Series 4000 System Modules use 400ns pulses, while series 1000 modules use 70ns pulses. Typical pulse generator and pulse amplifier circuits use pulse transformers to deliver their outputs.
