= Systems Concepts =

American computer hardware manufacturer

Systems Concepts, Inc.
- Industry: Computer; Technology
- Founder: Stewart Nelson; Mike Levitt
- Products: Hardware

Systems Concepts, Inc. (now the SC Group), was a company co-founded by Stewart Nelson and Mike Levitt focused on making hardware products related to the DEC PDP-10 series of computers. One of its major products was the SA-10, an interface which allowed PDP-10s to be connected to disk and tape drives designed for use with the channel interfaces of IBM mainframes.

Later, Systems Concepts attempted to produce a compatible replacement for the DEC PDP-10 computers. "Mars" was the code name for a family of PDP-10-compatible computers built by Systems Concepts, including the initial SC-30M, the smaller SC-25, and the slower SC-20. These machines were marvels of engineering design; although not much slower than the unique Foonly F-1, they were physically smaller and consumed less power than the much slower DEC KS10 or Foonly F-2, F-3, or F-4 machines. They were also completely compatible with the DEC KL10, and ran all KL10 binaries (including the operating system) with no modifications at about 2-3 times faster than a KL10.

When DEC cancelled the Jupiter project in 1983, Systems Concepts hoped to sell their machine to customers with a software investment in PDP-10s. Their spring 1984 announcement generated excitement in the PDP-10 world. TOPS-10 was running on the Mars by the summer of 1984, and TOPS-20 by early fall. However, people at Systems Concepts were better at designing machines than at mass-producing or selling them; the company continually improved the design, but lost credibility as delivery dates continued to slip. They also overpriced; believing they were competing with the KL10 and VAX 8600 and not startups such as Sun Microsystems building workstations with comparable power at a fraction of the price. By the time SC shipped the first SC-30M to Stanford University in late 1985, most customers had already abandoned the PDP-10, usually for VMS or Unix systems. Nevertheless, a number were purchased by CompuServe, which depended on PDP-10s to run its online service and was eager to move to newer but fully compatible systems. CompuServe's demand for the computers outpaced Systems Concepts' ability to produce them, so CompuServe licensed the design and built SC-designed computers itself. Other companies that purchased the SC-30 machines included Telmar, Reynolds and Reynolds, The Danish National Railway.

Peter Samson was director of marketing and program development.

SC later designed the SC-40, released in 1993, a faster follow-on to the SC-30M and SC-25. It can perform up to 8 times as fast as a DEC KL-10, and it also supports more physical memory, a larger virtual address space, and more modern input/output devices. These systems were also used at CompuServe.

In 1985, the company contracted to engineer and produce a PC-based cellular automata system for Tommaso Toffoli of MIT, called the CAM-6. The CAM-6 was a 2-card "sandwich" that plugged into an IBM PC slot and ran cellular automata rules at a 60 Hz update rate. Toffoli provided Forth-based software to operate the card. The production problems that plagued the company's computer products were demonstrated here as well, and only a few boards were produced.

Systems Concepts remained in business, having changed its name to the SC Group when it moved from California to Nevada.

== See also ==
Other companies that produced PDP-10 compatible computers:

- Foonly
- XKL
