= Incompatible Timesharing System =

Operating system

Incompatible Timesharing System (ITS)
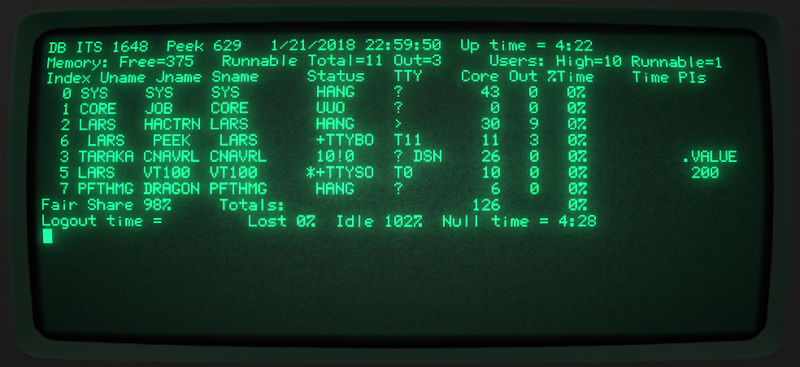
- Output from ITS PEEK task manager on a simulated CRT screen.
- Developer: MIT Artificial Intelligence Laboratory and Project MAC
- Written in: Assembly language
- Working state: Active
- Initial release: July 1967; 59 years ago
- Repository: github.com/PDP-10/its
- Available in: English
- Supported platforms: Digital PDP-6, PDP-10, (emulators now available)
- Default user interface: Command-line interface (DDT)
- License: GPL-3.0-or-later (current versions) GPL-2.0-or-later (1999 source release)

Incompatible Timesharing System (ITS) is a time-sharing operating system developed principally by the MIT Artificial Intelligence Laboratory, with help from Project MAC. The name is the jocular complement of the MIT Compatible Time-Sharing System (CTSS).

ITS, and the software developed on it, were technically and culturally influential far beyond their core user community. Remote "guest" or "tourist" access was easily available via the early ARPANET, allowing many interested parties to informally try out features of the operating system and application programs. The wide-open ITS philosophy and collaborative online community were a major influence on the hacker culture, as described in Steven Levy's book Hackers, and were the direct forerunners of the free and open-source software (FOSS), open-design, and Wiki movements.

== History ==
ITS development was initiated in the late 1960s by those (the majority of the MIT AI Lab staff at that time) who disagreed with the direction taken by Project MAC's Multics project (which had started in the mid-1960s), particularly such decisions as the inclusion of powerful system security. The name was chosen by Tom Knight as a joke on the name of the earliest MIT time-sharing operating system, the Compatible Time-Sharing System (CTSS), which dated from the early 1960s.

By simplifying their system compared to Multics, ITS's authors were able to quickly produce a functional operating system for their lab. ITS was written in assembly language, originally for the Digital Equipment Corporation PDP-6 computer, but the majority of ITS development and use was on the newer, largely upwards-compatible, PDP-10.

Although not used as intensively after about 1986, ITS continued to operate on original hardware at MIT until 1990, and then until 1995 at Stacken Computer Club in Sweden. Today, some ITS implementations continue to be remotely accessible, via emulation of PDP-10 hardware running on modern, low-cost computers supported by interested hackers.

== Significant technical features ==
ITS introduced many then-new features:

- The first device-independent graphics terminal output; programs generated generic commands to control screen content, which the system automatically translated into the appropriate character sequences for the particular type of terminal operated by the user.
- A general mechanism for implementing virtual devices in software running in user processes (which were called "jobs" in ITS).
- Using the virtual-device mechanism, ITS provided transparent inter-machine filesystem access. The ITS machines were all connected to the ARPAnet, and a user on one machine could perform the same operations with files on other ITS machines as if they were local files.
- Sophisticated process management; user processes were organized in a tree, and a superior process could control a large number of inferior processes. Any inferior process could be frozen at any point in its operation, and its state (including contents of the registers) examined; the process could then be resumed transparently.
- An advanced software interrupt facility that allowed user processes to operate asynchronously, using complex interrupt handling mechanisms.
- PCLSRing, a mechanism providing what appeared (to user processes) to be quasi-atomic, safely-interruptible system calls. No process could ever observe any process (including itself) in the middle of executing any system call.
- In support of the AI Lab's robotics work, ITS also supported simultaneous real-time and time-sharing operation.

== User environment ==
The environment seen by ITS users was philosophically significantly different from that provided by most operating systems at the time.

- Initially there were no passwords, and a user could work on ITS without logging on. Logging on was considered polite, though, so other people knew when one was active on the system.
- To deal with a rash of incidents where users sought out flaws in the system in order to crash it, a novel approach was taken. A command which could be run by anyone would cause the system to crash, taking away the challenge and notoriety of doing so. It first also broadcast a message to say who was initiating the crash.
- All files were editable by all users, including online documentation and source code. A series of informal papers and technical notes documented new commands, technical issues, primitive games, mathematical puzzles, and other topics of interest to the ITS hacker community. Some were issued as more formal AI Memos, including the iconic HAKMEM compendium.
- All users could talk with instant messaging on another's terminal, or they could use a command (SHOUT) to ask all active users for help.
- Users could see what was happening on another's terminal (using a command called OS for "output spy"). A target of OS could detect and kill it using another command called JEDGAR, named after FBI Director J. Edgar Hoover. This facility was later disabled with a placebo command: it appeared as if the remote session was killed, but it was not.
- Tourists (guest users either at MIT AI Lab terminals, or over the ARPAnet) were tolerated and occasionally invited to actively join the ITS community. Informal policy on tourist access was later formalized in a written policy. Ease of access, with or without a guest account, allowed interested parties to informally explore and experiment with the operating system, application programs, and hacker culture. Working copies of documentation and source code could be freely consulted or updated by anybody on the system.
- System security, to the extent that it existed, was mostly-based on de facto "security by obscurity". Guest hackers willing to dedicate significant time and effort to learning ITS were expected to behave respectfully, and to avoid interfering with the research projects which funded the hardware and software systems. There was little of exclusive value on the ITS systems except information, much of which would eventually be published for free distribution, and open and free sharing of knowledge was generally encouraged.

The wide-open ITS philosophy and collaborative community were the direct forerunner of the free and open-source software (FOSS), open-design, and Wiki movements.

== Important applications developed on ITS ==
The EMACS ("Editor MACroS") editor was originally written on ITS. In its ITS instantiation it was a collection of TECO programs (called "macros"). On later operating systems, it was written in the common language of those systems – for example, the C language under Unix, and Zetalisp under the Lisp Machine system.

GNU′s info help system was originally an EMACS subsystem, and then was later written as a complete standalone system for Unix-like machines.

Several important programming languages and systems were developed on ITS, including MacLisp (the precursor of Zetalisp and Common Lisp), Microplanner (implemented in MacLisp), MDL (which became the basis of Infocom's programming environment), and Scheme.

Among other significant and influential software subsystems developed on ITS, the Macsyma symbolic algebra system, started in 1968, was the first widely-known mathematical computing environment. It was a forerunner of Maxima, MATLAB, Wolfram Mathematica, and many other computer algebra systems.

Terry Winograd's natural-language interpreter SHRDLU was developed on ITS. The computer game Zork was also originally written on ITS.

Richard Greenblatt's Mac Hack VI was the top-rated chess program for years and was the first to display a graphical board representation.

== Miscellaneous ==
The default ITS top-level command interpreter was the PDP-10 machine language debugger (DDT). The usual text editor on ITS was TECO and later Emacs, which was written in TECO. Both DDT and TECO were implemented through simple dispatch tables on single-letter commands, and thus had no true syntax. The ITS task manager was called PEEK.

The local spelling "TURIST" is an artifact of six-character filename (and other identifier) limitations, which is traceable to six SIXBIT encoded characters fitting into a single 36-bit PDP-10 word. "TURIST" may also have been a pun on Alan Turing, a pioneer of theoretical computer science. The less-complimentary term "LUSER" was also applied to guest users, especially those who repeatedly engaged in clueless or vandalous behavior.

The Jargon File started as a combined effort between people on the ITS machines at MIT and at Stanford University SAIL. The document described much of the terminology, puns, and culture of the two AI Labs and related research groups, and is the direct predecessor of the Hacker's Dictionary (1983), the first compendium of hacker jargon to be issued by a major publisher (MIT Press).

Different implementations of ITS supported an odd array of peripherals, including an automatic wire stripper devised by hacker Richard Greenblatt, who needed a supply of pre-stripped jumper wires of various lengths for wire-wrapping computer hardware he and others were prototyping. The device used a stepper motor and a formerly hand-held wire stripper tool and cutter, operated by solenoid, all under computer control from ITS software. The device was accessible by any ITS user, but was disappointingly unreliable in actual use.

The Xerox Graphics Printer (XGP), one of the first laser printers, was supported by ITS by 1974. The MIT AI Lab had one of these prototype continuous roll-fed printers for experimentation and use by its staff. By 1982, the XGP was supplemented by a Xerox Dover printer, an early sheet-fed laser printer. Although any ITS user could send files to the laser printers, physical access to pick up printouts was limited to staff and others who obtained access to the MIT lab, to control usage of printer supplies which had to be specially ordered.

CTSS and ITS file systems have a number of design elements in common. Both have an M.F.D. (master file directory) and one or more U.F.D. (user file directories). Neither of them have nested directories (sub-directories). Both have file names consisting of two names which are a maximum of six-characters long. Both support linked files.

== Original developers ==
- Richard Greenblatt
- Stewart Nelson
- Tom Knight
- Richard Stallman

== See also ==
- Time-sharing system evolution
