= Xerox Dover =

Early laser printer

The Xerox Dover laser printer was an early laser printer manufactured at Xerox PARC in the late 1970s. Around 35 were built. It was a successor to the EARS printer, itself a successor to the Xerox Graphics Printer.

The Dover was developed by Gary Starkweather. The printer was based on a stripped down Xerox 7000 reduction duplicator chassis.

== Description ==
The Dover has a maximum resolution of 384 pels horizontally and vertically. It uses cut-sheet 8 1/2 x 11 in. paper, and paper speed is 1.2 inches per second. The Dover has a Length of 65 in., and a Width of 32 in. Its weight is 1250 lb.

== Users ==
Dover printers were in use at several high-profile computer science research labs. A Dover printer was installed at Stanford University's computer science department in 1980, and a Dover printer was available at the MIT AI Lab in 1982, hosted by a Xerox Alto computer.
