= TJ-2 =

- Memo: TJ-2: Type Justifying Program
- Original author(s): Peter Samson
- Initial release: May 1963; 61 years ago
- Platform: PDP-1
- Type: Page layout
- Website: PDP-1 Restoration Project

TJ-2 (Type Justifying Program) was published by Peter Samson in May 1963 and is thought to be the first page layout program. Although it lacks page numbering, page headers and footers, TJ-2 is the first word processor to provide a number of essential typographic alignment and automatic typesetting features:

- Columnation, indentation, margins, justification, and centering
- Word wrap, page breaks and automatic hyphenation
- Tab stop simulation

Developed from two earlier Samson programs, Justify and TJ-1, TJ-2 was written for the PDP-1 that was donated to the Massachusetts Institute of Technology in 1961 by Digital Equipment Corporation.

Taking English text as input, TJ-2 aligns left and right margins, justifying the output using white space and word hyphenation. Text is marked-up with single lowercase characters combined with the PDP-1's overline character, carriage returns, and internal concise codes. The computer's six toggle switches control the input and output devices, enable and disable hyphenation and stop the session. Words can be hyphenated with a light pen on the computer's CRT display and from the session's dictionary in memory. On-screen hyphenation has SAVE and FORGET commands and OOPS, the undo.

Comments in the code were quoted thirty years later: "The ways of God are just and can be justified to man" and "Girls who wear pants should be sure that the end justifies the jeans."

TJ-2 was succeeded by TYPSET and RUNOFF, a pair of complementary programs written in 1964 for the CTSS operating system. TYPSET and RUNOFF soon evolved into runoff for Multics, which was in turn ported to Unix in the 1970s as roff.

A similar program for the ITS PDP-6 and later the PDP-10 was TJ6.

== See also ==
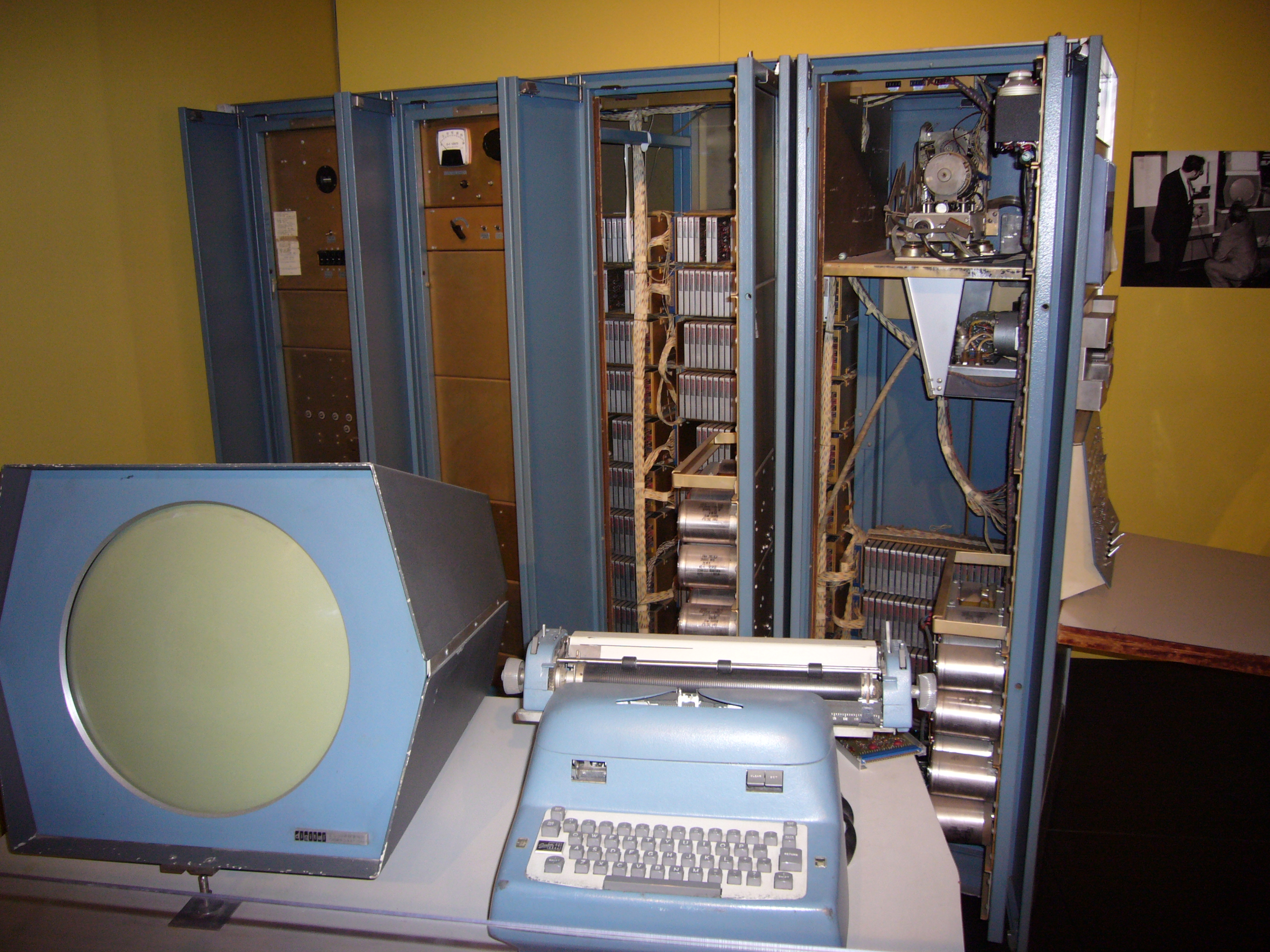
DEC PDP-1 at the Computer History Museum

- Colossal Typewriter
- Desktop publishing
- Expensive Typewriter
- Peter Samson
- Text editor
- Text Editor and Corrector (TECO)
- TYPSET and RUNOFF
