= I Was Thirteen =

1847 Ukrainian poem

I was thirteen... (Ukrainian: Мені тринадцятий минало...) is an autobiographic poem by Ukrainian poet Taras Shevchenko, written around the second half of 1847 during his imprisonment in Orsk fortress. Shevchenko dedicated the poem to an unknown person hidden under the cryptonym N.N., which serves as the work's header.

== Content ==
The poem describes a day from the author's childhood life as a serf in his village. While pasturing lambs and observing the beautiful nature, the protagonist comes to realize, that he had been deprived of his own house and property, and that "God has not given anything" to him. The boy starts to cry, but a girl picking hemp nearby comes to greet him and gives him a kiss. After that the couple drives their master's lambs to water, joking on their way.

In the afterword the author grieves the fact that he couldn't die in his native land, working in the fields, but instead came to know the world and turned into a "holy fool" (Ukrainian: юродивий) who damned God and humanity.

It is presumed, that the girl depicted in the poem and the person to which the text was dedicated is one and the same person - Shevchenko's childhood friend Oksana Kovalenko, who is also mentioned in another work by the author.

== Publication ==
The poem was first published in 1867 in Saint Petersburg (as part of Kobzar) and in Lviv. The Lviv edition omitted the mention of God in the last line of the text.

== Sources ==
- English translation of the poem by John Weir (link)
