= Superscription =

Superscription may refer to:

- something written on a surface, see epigraphy
- writing on a cover or envelope
  - Address (geography)
  - Book cover
- a header in a biblical text such as the Book of Psalms, see Psalms#Superscriptions, and the writings of the prophets, e.g. Isaiah 1:1

== See also ==
- Page header
- Lead paragraph
- Title
- Colophon (publishing)
