= TYPSET and RUNOFF =

Early typesetting programs

- Original author: Jerome H. Saltzer
- Initial release: 1964; 61 years ago
- Written in: MAD and FAP
- Operating system: Compatible Time-Sharing System
- Platform: IBM 7094
- Type: Document editor and text formatting programs

TYPSET is an early document editor that was used with the 1964-released RUNOFF program, one of the earliest text formatting programs to see significant use.

Of two earlier print/formatting programs DITTO and TJ-2, only the latter had, and introduced, text justification; RUNOFF also added pagination.

The name RUNOFF, and similar names led to other formatting program implementations. By 1982, Runoff (a name not possible before lowercase letters were introduced to filenames) largely became associated with Digital Equipment Corporation and Unix computers. DEC used the terms VAX DSR and DSR to refer to VAX DIGITAL Standard Runoff.

== History ==
=== CTSS ===
The original RUNOFF type-setting program for CTSS was written by Jerome H. Saltzer circa 1964. Bob Morris and Doug McIlroy translated that from MAD to BCPL. Morris and McIlroy then moved the BCPL version to Multics when the IBM 7094 on which CTSS ran was being shut down.

=== Multics ===
Documentation for the Multics version of RUNOFF described it as "types out text segments in manuscript form."

=== Other versions and implementations ===
A later version of runoff for Multics was written in PL/I by Dennis Capps, in 1974. This runoff code was the ancestor of roff that was written for the fledgling Unix in assembly language by Ken Thompson.

Other versions of Runoff were developed for various computer systems including Digital Equipment Corporation's PDP-11 minicomputer systems running RT-11, RSTS/E, RSX, PDP-10 mainframe systems running TOPS-10 and TOPS-20, and for OpenVMS on VAX minicomputers, as well as UNIVAC Series 90 mainframes using the EDT text editor under the VS/9 operating system. These different releases of Runoff typically had little in common except the convention of indicating a command to Runoff by beginning the line with a period.

The origin of IBM's SCRIPT software began in 1968 when IBM contracted Stuart Madnick of MIT to write a simple document preparation tool for CP/67, which he modelled on MIT's CTSS RUNOFF.

== Background ==
RUNOFF was written in 1964 for the CTSS operating system by Jerome H. Saltzer in MAD and FAP.

It actually consisted of a pair of programs, TYPSET (which was basically a document editor), and RUNOFF (the output processor). RUNOFF had support for pagination and headers, as well as text justification (TJ-2 appears to have been the earliest text justification system, but it did not have the other capabilities).

RUNOFF is a direct predecessor of the runoff document formatting program of Multics, which in turn was the ancestor of the roff and nroff document formatting programs of Unix, and their descendants. It was also the ancestor of FORMAT for the IBM System/360, and of course indirectly of every computerized word processing system.

Likewise, RUNOFF for CTSS was the predecessor of the various RUNOFFs for DEC's operating systems, via the RUNOFF developed by the University of California, Berkeley's Project Genie for the SDS 940 system.

The name is alleged to have come from the phrase at the time, I'll run off a copy.

TYPESET contains features inspired by a variety of other programs including Colossal Typewriter and Expensive Typewriter.

== Example ==
Input:

When you're ready to order,
call us at our toll free number:
.BR
.CENTER
1-800-555-xxxx
.BR
Your order will be processed
within two working days and shipped

Output:

   When you're ready to order, call us at our toll free number:

                             1-800-555-xxxx

   Your order will be processed within two working days and shipped

== See also ==
- SCRIPT (markup)
- TECO
- TJ-2
