= Charles Goldfarb =

American computer scientist and lawyer

Charles F. Goldfarb
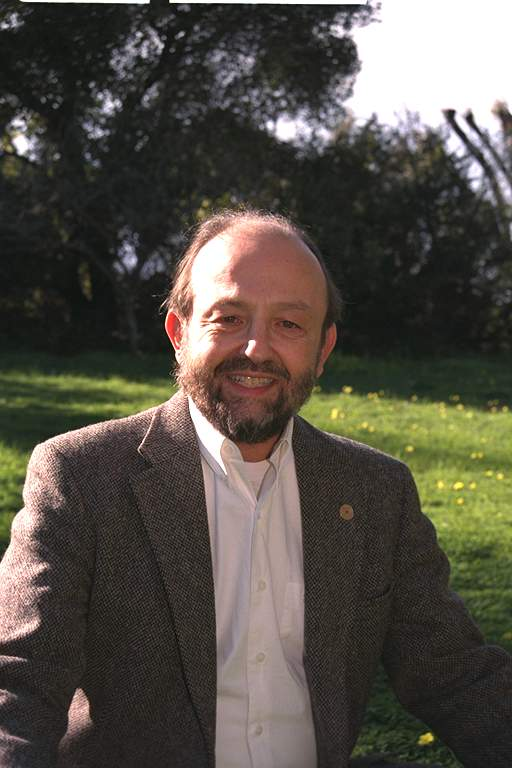
- Charles Goldfarb in 2008
- Born: November 26, 1939 (age 86)
- Education: Columbia College; Harvard Law School (JD)
- Occupations: Computer scientist; Lawyer; Independent consultant; Speaker
- Employer: IBM (1967–unknown)
- Known for: Designing GML and SGML
- Title: Research team lead, IBM Cambridge (1969 – before 1975); Product planner, IBM Almaden (1975 – c. late 1980s); Editor, SGML ISO committee (c. 1980 – 1986); Chair, SGML committee (1986–unknown); Director, Innodata Isogen (2000–2005); Advisor, ObjectBuilders (2006 – before 2017)
- Awards: Honorary Fellow, STC; PIA Gutenberg Award
- Website: http://www.sgmlsource.com/ (defunct)

Charles F. Goldfarb (born 26 November 1939) is known as the creator of Generalized Markup Language (GML) and Standard Generalized Markup Language (SGML), and as the grandfather of the technologies built on SGML—namely HTML and the World Wide Web. He coined the term markup language, and co-invented its concept alongside William W. Tunnicliffe, whom he claims brought the idea to his attention.

== GML and SGML ==
In 1969 Goldfarb, leading a small team at IBM, developed Generalized Markup Language (GML)—the first of its kind. Goldfarb coined the initialism GML after its three developers: himself, Edward Mosher, and Raymond Lorie.

In 1974, Goldfarb designed the SGML syntax and subsequently wrote the first SGML parser, ARC-SGML. SGML facilitates the sharing of machine-readable documents for large projects. SGML was used by the Department of Defense in aerospace engineering and industrial publishing. Goldfarb began working on drafting the SGML syntax into an industry standard from 1978. Acceptance of working drafts began in 1980, with work continuing until 1986, when it was formally accepted as the ISO 8879 standard. Goldfarb served as the editor of the standardization committee.

== Other endeavors ==
Goldfarb graduated with a JD from Harvard Law School before being hired at IBM. He worked at IBM, with the majority of his tenure at the Almaden Research Center—spending at least a decade there. His work, unofficial and later official, on SGML's specification was done during that time. He is an independent consultant and speaker based in Belmont, California.

== Bibliography ==
- Rubinsky, Yuri, ed. (1990). The SGML Handbook. Clarendon Press. ISBN 0-19-853737-9.
  - 1991 reprint by Oxford University Press
- —; Pepper, Steve; Ensign, Chet (1998). SGML Buyer's Guide: A Unique Guide to Determining Your Requirements and Choosing the Right SGML and XML Products and Services. University of Michigan: Prentice Hall. ISBN 0-13-681511-1.
- —; Prescod, Paul (1998). The XML Handbook (1st ed.). University of California: Prentice Hall. ISBN 0-13-081152-1.
  - —; Prescod, Paul (2001). The XML Handbook (3rd ed.). University of Virginia: Prentice Hall. ISBN 0-13-055068-X.
