= SCRIPT (markup) =

Markup language for IBM computers

SCRIPT, any of a series of text markup languages starting with Script under Control Program-67/Cambridge Monitor System (CP-67/CMS) and Script/370 under Virtual Machine Facility/370 (VM/370) and the Time Sharing Option (TSO) of OS/VS2; the current version, SCRIPT/VS, is part of IBM's Document Composition Facility (DCF) for IBM z/VM and z/OS systems. SCRIPT was developed for CP-67/CMS by Stuart Madnick at MIT, succeeding CTSS RUNOFF.

SCRIPT is a procedural markup language. Inline commands called control words, indicated by a period in the first column of a logical line, describe the desired appearance of the formatted text. SCRIPT originally provided a 2PASS option to allow text to refer to variables defined later in the text, but subsequent versions allowed more than two passes.

== History ==
In 1968 "IBM contracted Stuart Madnick of MIT to write a simple document preparation ..." to run on CP/67. He modeled it on MIT's CTSS RUNOFF. In 1974, William Dwyer at Yale University ported the CP-67 version of Script to the Time Sharing Option (TSO) of OS/360 under the name NSCRIPT. The University of Waterloo rewrote and extended NSCRIPT as Waterloo SCRIPT, also in 1974, making it available for free to CMS and TSO users for several releases before eventually charging for new releases.

By 1978, IBM's Script/370, running on VM/CMS, had evolved into Document Composition Facility (DCF), supporting SCRIPT/VS on CMS, DOS/VS, OS/VS1 and OS/VS2, and supported the IBM 3800. In addition, there was a PC DOS/MS-DOS version called SCRIPT/PC.

== Native SCRIPT control words ==
Native Script control begin with a period and have a space prior to operands. They normally begin in column 1, but you may code multiple control words, separated by semicolons, on a single line.

The description and table below refer to selected control words in DCF; older versions are similar.

SCRIPT allows space units in control words to be specified in a number of units including inches, centimeters, millimeters, picas, ciceros, m-spaces, or device units (pels at the current device resolution). Vertical space units are assumed to be lines unless otherwise specified.

control word	function	example	
.sp	Inserts blank vertical space	.sp 1	Inserts one blank line
.ce	Centers following lines	.ce 2	Centers the following two lines on the current page or column
.ez	Controls EasyScript	.ez P foo bar	Starts paragraph with text foo bar; equivalent to &P.foo bar after .ez on
.im	Imbeds a file at the current location	.im BLRPLT	Inserts the file 'BLRPLT SCRIPT'
.ju	Turn on/off justify mode	.ju on	Requests that subsequent lines be justified until .ju off is encountered
.rh	Specify running head information	.rh	Identify following lines as running head until .rh off is encountered
.df	Define a named font	.df examp type('Century Schoolbook' 10 light)	Specifies attributes for font named 'examp'.
.bf	Specify font for following text	.bf title	'title' is the name of a font identified by a .df control word.
.se	Assigns a value to a variable symbol	.se month = January	Assigns a value to the symbol &month that will replace every subsequent occurrence of &month in the input text until &month is redefined.

== SCRIPT macros ==
Script includes a facility for user-defined macros and for automatically reading a profile containing macro definitions and other commands. Several packages for semantic tagging, including GML and EasyScript, are built on top of this facility.

== Generalized Markup Language ==
IBM's Generalized Markup Language (GML) is a descriptive markup layer describing the logical structure of a document. Both SCRIPT/VS and the GML Starter Set are part of IBM's Document Composition Facility (DCF), used in the System/370 platform and successors. The tag sets of the BookMaster and BookManager BUILD/MVS products are built on a foundation of the GML Starter Set syntax and implementation.

The Standard Generalized Markup Language (SGML) is a descendant of GML. While DCF does not directly handle SGML, there is an SGML translator available as a separate product.

=== EasyScript ===
EasyScript is a set of macro definitions and profiles included with Script/370 Version 3 that implements a primitive version of GML. Tags are variables whose values have been set to control words, allowing multiple tags in a single line.

.ez on
&P.This is a paragraph.
&N1.First item
&N2.First subitem
&N2.Second subitem
&N1.Second item

is roughly equivalent to

This is a paragraph

1. First item
  1. First subitem
  2. Second subitem
2. Second item

=== GML Starter Set (GMLSS) ===
The GML Starter Set (GMLSS) is a set of macro definitions and profiles that implements a set of tags that has more of a semantic orientation than the raw Script/VS control words. Tags begin with a colon and end with a period, and may contain attributes between the name and the closing period; a line may contain multiple tags.

=== BookMaster ===
Bookmaster is an IBM product, "designed for high-volume in-house publishing applications", that extends the GML Starter Set of DCF. It consists of "a rich set of GML vocabulary for creating complex document layouts." Bookmaster runs under the z/VM and z/OS operating systems.

Although IBM no longer supports BookMaster, there is software to convert old BookMaster documents to HTML.

=== BookManager ===
BookManager is a family of products for producing and reading online books. BookManager BUILD/MVS and BookManager BUILD/VM are layered on top of SCRIPT and BookMaster and can run on z/VM and z/OS. Other BookManager BUILD products for generating text run on Linux, Windows or OS/2 and convert files produced by various word processors to BookManager format. BookManager Read products for viewing text run on a variety of systems. BookManager BookServer is a multi-platform system to "serve your electronic books to HTML browsers."

BookManager electronic documents typically have filenames ending with the extension .BOO. IBM offers several no charge tools to work with and read BookManager documents including a reader/viewer called IBM Softcopy Reader. An independent developer, Kev Bowling, created and released software that uses IBM's BookManager code libraries to convert BookManager documents to PDF.

== See also ==
- Markup language
- Typesetting
- Runoff
- Scribe (markup language)
