= Colossal Typewriter =

Computer program

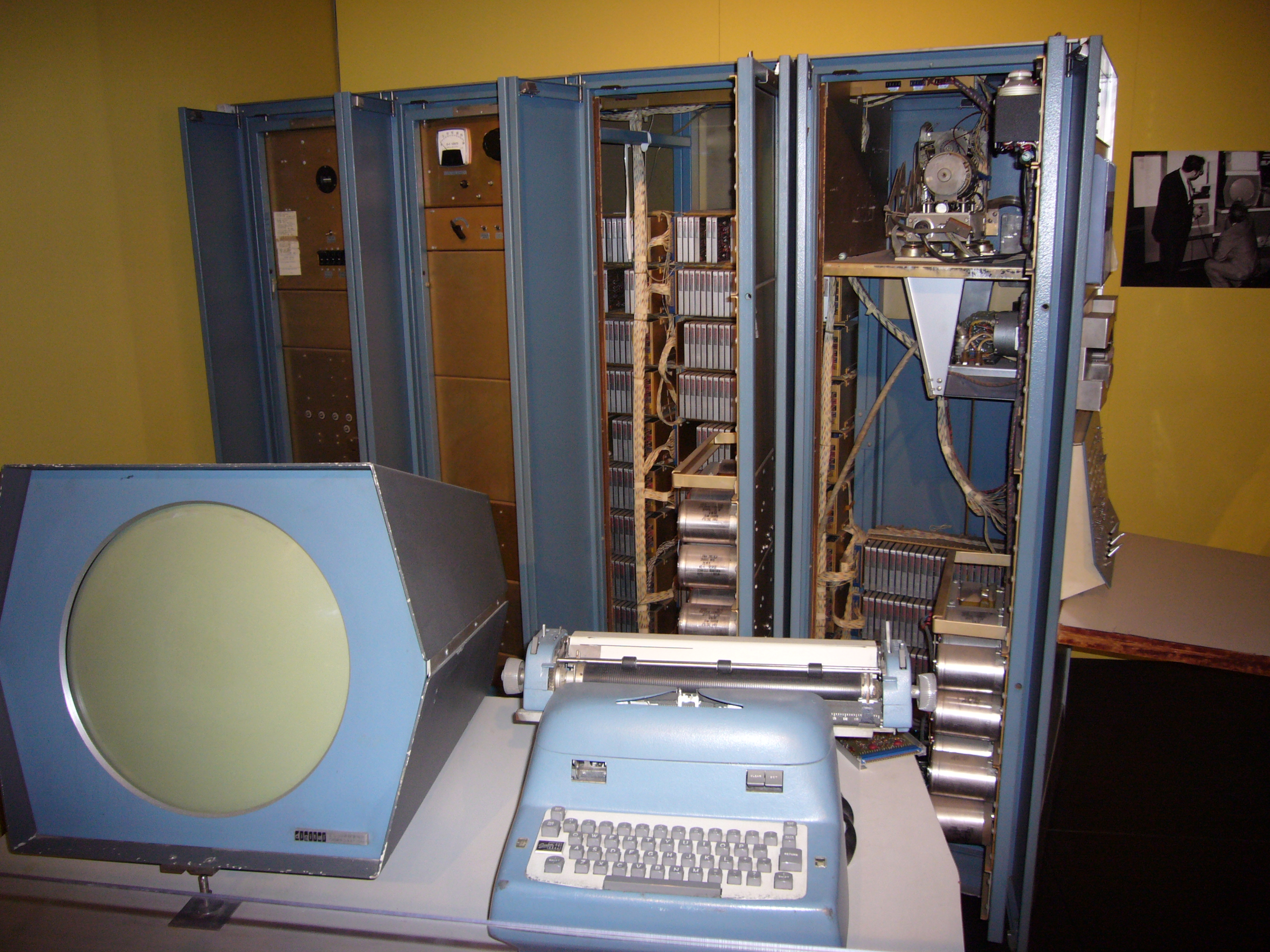
- DEC PDP-1 at the Computer History Museum
- Original author(s): John McCarthy and Roland Silver
- Initial release: 1960
- Platform: PDP-1 and possibly TX-0
- Type: Text editor
- Website: PDP-1 Restoration Project

Colossal Typewriter by John McCarthy and Roland Silver was one of the earliest computer text editors. The program ran on the PDP-1 at Bolt, Beranek and Newman (BBN) by December 1960.

About this time, both authors were associated with the Massachusetts Institute of Technology, but it is unclear whether the editor ran on the TX-0 on loan to MIT from Lincoln Laboratory or on the PDP-1 donated to MIT in 1961 by Digital Equipment Corporation. A "Colossal Typewriter Program" is in the BBN Program Library, and, under the same name, in the DECUS Program Library as BBN- 6 (CT).

== See also ==
- Expensive Typewriter
- TECO
- RUNOFF
- TJ-2
