= Daniel Murphy (computer scientist) =

American computer scientist

Daniel Lee Murphy was an American computer scientist notable for his involvement in the development of TECO (an early text editor and programming language), the operating systems TENEX and TOPS-20, and email.

== Biography ==
Murphy attended MIT from 1961 and graduated in 1965. In 1962, he created the text editor Text Editor and Corrector (TECO), later implemented on most of the PDP computers. He also developed a simple software demand paging system in software for the PDP-1 while at MIT.

Murphy joined Bolt, Beranek and Newman BBN in 1965. There he used an SDS 940 computer running the Berkeley Timesharing System, which provided page memory management in hardware. When the PDP-10 was announced, he was one of the architects of the TENEX operating system developed for the custom paging hardware designed at BBN. As part of the development of TENEX, Murphy and Ray Tomlinson wrote the original email program.

In October 1972, he joined Digital Equipment Corporation where he first worked as a contractor porting TENEX to the KI10 model of the PDP-10 family. On January 2, 1973, he joined DEC as an employee, heading the team responsible for the development of the TOPS-20 operating system, an evolution of TENEX for the newer models of the PDP-10 family. TOPS-20 was first marketed in 1976 on the DECSYSTEM-20.

Daniel L. Murphy, 83, of Hollis, New Hampshire, died peacefully on January 30, 2026.
