= Ben Gurley =

American computer scientist

Ben Gurley (December 23, 1926 – November 7, 1963) was an important figure in the history of computing. At MIT Lincoln Laboratory, Gurley designed the cathode-ray tube display and light pen of the TX-0, a pioneering transistor computer. In 1959 Gurley left Lincoln Labs for Digital Equipment Corporation; he was the designer of DEC's first computer, the PDP-1.

Gurley died of a gunshot fired through a window in his home while eating dinner with his family. A former co-worker from DEC was convicted of the crime. This incident inspired acquaintance and author John Updike to write his popular novel "The Music School".
