= William W. Tunnicliffe =

US computer pioneer (1922–1996)

- Born: April 22, 1922; Washington, D.C., United States
- Died: September 12, 1996 (aged 74)
- Education: Worcester Polytechnic Institute (1943); Harvard (1951)
- Occupation: Engineer

William Warren Tunnicliffe (April 22, 1922 – September 12, 1996) is credited by Charles Goldfarb as being the first person (1967) to articulate the idea of separating the definition of formatting from the structure of content in electronic documents (separation of presentation and content).

In September 1967, during a meeting at the Canadian Government Printing Office, Tunnicliffe gave a presentation on the separation of information content of documents from their format. In the 1970s, Tunnicliffe led the development of a standard called GenCode for the publishing industry. He served as the first chair of the International Organization for Standardization committee that developed the first international standard for markup languages, ISO 8879.

Tunnicliffe was a member and former chairman of the Printing Industries of America, and held the rank of admiral in the US Navy and Navy Reserves until 1982.

== See also ==
- Markup language
