= Expensive Typewriter =

Computer program

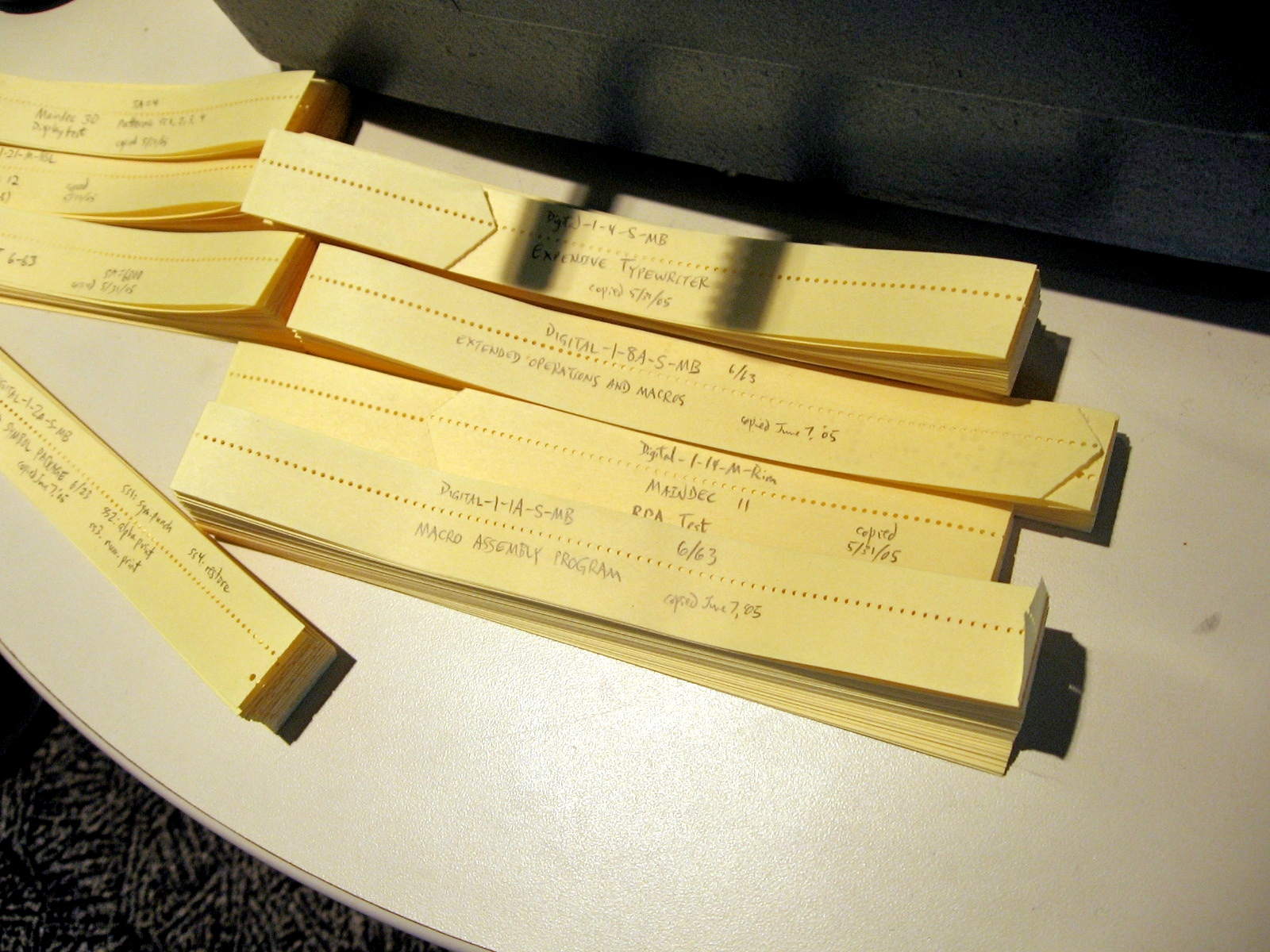
A partially-shadowed paper tape at the Computer History Museum holds a copy of the Expensive Typewriter program binaries, ready for loading

Expensive Typewriter was a pioneering text editor program that ran on the DEC PDP-1 computer, which had been delivered to MIT in the early 1960s.

== Description ==
Since the program could drive an IBM Selectric typewriter (a letter-quality printer), it may be considered the first word processing software. It was written and improved between 1961 and 1962 by Steve Piner and L. Peter Deutsch. In the spirit of an earlier editor program, named "Colossal Typewriter", it was called "Expensive Typewriter" because at that time the PDP-1 cost a lot of money (approximately US$100,000 in 1963, US$1,000,000 in 2024 dollars) as compared to a conventional manual typewriter.

== See also ==
- PDP-1
- Expensive Desk Calculator
- Expensive Planetarium
- Expensive Tape Recorder
- Text Editor and Corrector
- RUNOFF
- TJ-2
