= Agility PR Solutions =

Canadian media monitoring company

- Type: Subsidiary
- Industry: Public relations
- Predecessor: MediaMiser
- Founded: 2003; 23 years ago in Ottawa
- Founders: Brett Serjeantson, Chris Morrison, and Martin Lyster
- Headquarters: Ottawa, Canada
- Area served: Canada, United States and United Kingdom
- Key people: Martin Lyster (CEO), Tom Perchinsky (CSO)
- Products: Media Monitoring, Media Analysis, Public Relations Services, PR Software, Marketing Resources, Media Contacts Database, Press Release Distribution
- Owner: Innodata
- Number of employees: 270
- Subsidiaries: Bulldog Reporter
- Website: www.agilitypr.com

Agility PR Solutions (formerly MediaMiser ) is a Canadian provider of media relations, media monitoring and intelligence software and professional services for public relations and marketing professionals. The company has been owned by American Innodata Inc since 2014.

Agility PR Solutions uses proprietary technology to monitor, aggregate, analyze and share content from more than 200,000 sources across social, traditional and digital media to provide detailed analysis reports and daily briefings to its customers, which include several Fortune 500 companies as well as small- and medium-sized businesses.

== History ==
The company was founded in 2003 by Brett Serjeantson, Chris Morrison, and Martin Lyster as MediaMiser to provide traditional and social media monitoring and analysis. It closed a financing round for $1million in 2011.

In July 2014, Innodata Inc. (NASDAQ: INOD), an American company that provides business process, technology and consulting services, acquired Agility (then MediaMiser).

In December 2014, MediaMiser acquired intellectual property and related assets of Bulldog Reporter, a PR company providing PR industry newsletters, journalist databases, media intelligence and a PR awards program entitled Bulldog Awards.
