= BBN Time-Sharing System =

Computer operating system

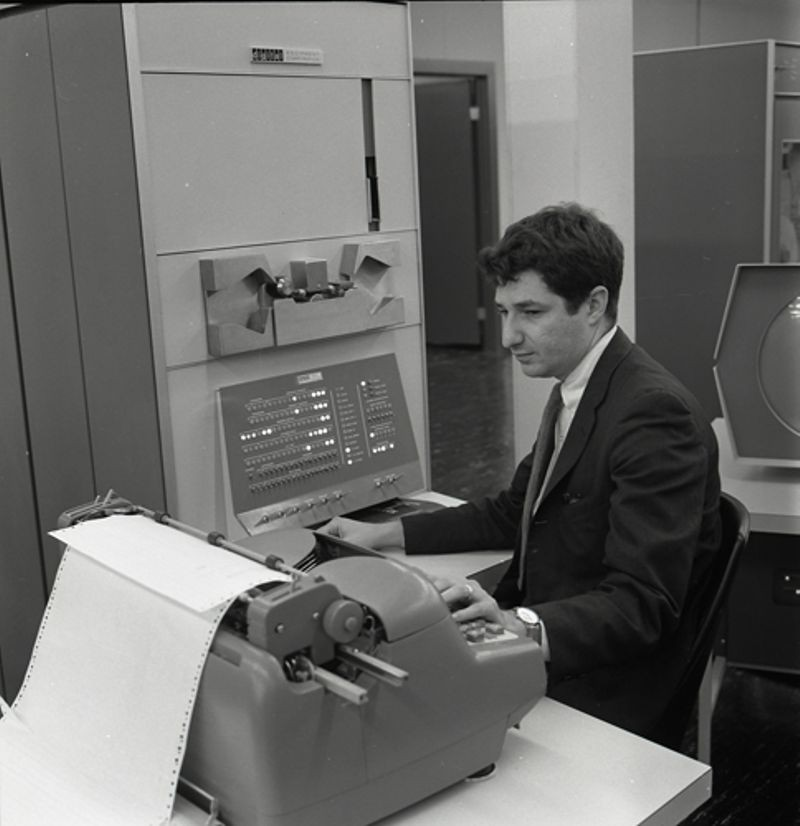
- Ed Fredkin working on PDP-1, c. 1960
- Developer: Bolt, Beranek and Newman (BBN)
- Working state: Historic
- Initial release: September 1962; 62 years ago
- Platforms: PDP-1

The BBN Time-Sharing System was an early time-sharing system created at Bolt, Beranek and Newman (BBN) for the PDP-1 computer. It began operation in September 1962.

== History ==
J. C. R. Licklider left MIT to become a vice president at Bolt Beranek and Newman in 1957. He learned about time-sharing from Christopher Strachey at a UNESCO-sponsored conference on Information Processing in Paris in June 1959.

Digital Equipment Corporation's prototype PDP-1 was ready in November, 1959, and the machine was featured in the November/December issue of Datamation magazine. BBNer Ed Fredkin saw a prototype system at the Eastern Joint Computer Conference in Boston in December 1959, and was extremely interested. Given BBN's interest, DEC's founder and President Ken Olsen visited and explained that DEC had just completed construction of a prototype PDP-1, and that they needed a test site for a month. BBN agreed to be the test site, at its regular hourly rates, and then in early 1960 obtained the prototype PDP-1. The first production PDP-1 arrived in November 1960, and was formally accepted in April 1961.

With the PDP-1 installed at BBN, in 1960 Licklider took on MIT's John McCarthy and Marvin Minsky as consultants. McCarthy had been advocating for the concept of time-sharing computers since the same year, but had found slow progress at MIT. At BBN, Licklider and Fredkin were keenly interested. In particular, Fredkin insisted that "timesharing could be done on a small computer, namely, a PDP-1." As Fredkin recounts:

John’s invention of time-sharing and his telling me about his ideas all occurred before the PDP-1 existed. When I first saw the PDP-1 at the Eastern Joint Computer Conference, I realized that it was the perfect low-cost vehicle for implementing John's ideas. That is why I specified that several of the modifications for time sharing be part of the PDP-1b.

McCarthy recalled in 1989:

I kept arguing with him. I said "Well, you’d have to ... get an interrupt system." And he said, "We can do that. You'd have to get some kind of swapper." I said “We can do that."

Accordingly, a BBN team, largely led by Sheldon Boilen, built custom hardware add-ons to the company's second PDP-1 to provide an external interrupt system and a magnetic drum for swapping storage. To this end, BBN acquired the first UNIVAC FASTRAND rotating drum, with a 45-Mbyte storage capacity and an access time of about 0.1 second.

In Fall 1962, BBN conducted a public demonstration of the BBN Time-Sharing System, with one operator in Washington, D.C., and two in Cambridge.

== Hardware support for time-sharing ==
As described in McCarthy et al., the computer's hardware was as follows: "The PDP-1 is a single address binary computer with an 18 bit word and five microsecond memory cycle; most instructions require ten microseconds to execute. The basic memory size is 4096 words, but up to 65,536 words may be addressed indirectly. The machine we used has 8192 words, 4096 of which are reserved for the time-sharing system. Each user sees a 4096 word memory.... Attached to the computer is a high speed magnetic drum memory divided into 22 fields each of 4096 words. A basic operation of the drum system is the memory-swap accomplished in 33 milliseconds. In this operation 4096 words are transferred from the core memory to a drum field and simultaneously the core memory is loaded from a different drum field.... A 4096 word drum field is allocated for saving the core image of each user when his program is not running. A user's program in run status is run for 140 milliseconds, then if there is another user also in run status, the state of core memory is stored in the first user's core image on drum and simultaneously the second user's core image is loaded into core and the second user's program is started in the appropriate place."

== See also ==
- Timeline of operating systems
- Time-sharing system evolution
