= Page footer =

Page section located under the main text

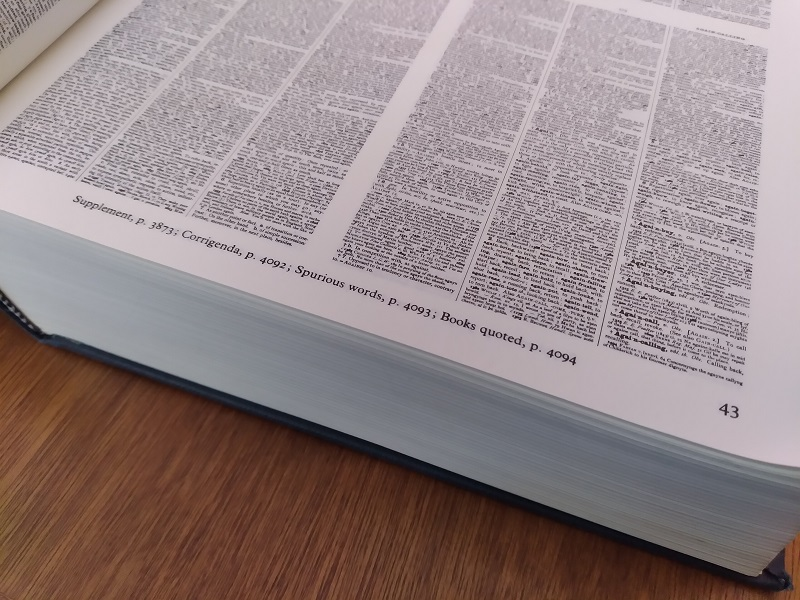
Footer from the Oxford Dictionary showing the page number and references to other pages with relevant content

In typography and word processing, the page footer (or simply footer) of a printed page is a section located under the main text, or body. It is typically used as the space for the page number. In the earliest printed books it also contained the first words of the next page; in this case they preferred to place the page number in the page header, in the top margin. Because of the lack of a set standard, in modern times the header and footer are sometimes interchangeable. In some instances, there are elements of the header inserted into the footer, such as the book or chapter title, the name of the author or other information. In the publishing industry the page footer is traditionally known as the running foot, whereas the page header is the running head.

== Desktop publishing ==
In desktop publishing applications, the footer identifies the space at the bottom of a page displayed on a computer or other device. Some software automatically inserts certain information in the footer, including the page number and the date and time of creation or editing the document, data which can be removed or changed. If desired, the user can add a logo or company name, the name of the author, title or other useful information (links, copyright, addresses, phone numbers, etc.) The footer is sometimes duplicated over all of the pages in the document, with the page number increasing accordingly. Similarly, this duplication is sometimes applied to the header.

== Webpages ==
In HTML, the footer is a sectioning element, and if used is most often used for copyright information or author information. It is sometimes in a separate style from the rest of the webpage, achieved using CSS.

== See also ==
- Bates numbering
- Page header
- Table of contents
- Watermark
