= Innodata =

American company

Innodata Inc.
- Type: Public
- Traded as: Nasdaq: INOD
- Industry: Information Technology
- Founded: 1988; 38 years ago
- Headquarters: Hackensack, New Jersey
- Key people: Jack Abuhoff (president & CEO); AK Mishra (EVP & COO); O’Neil Nalavadi (SVP & CFO); Brett Serjeanston (MediaMiser, CEO & Co-founder of MediaMiser); Lisa Indovino (SVP Digital Data Solutions); R. Douglas Kemp (SVP, Product Innovation); Kevin Perry (VP, Sales); Amy R. Agress (VP & general counsel)
- Services: Content and Data Enrichment e-Publishing; Information Product Development; Media Monitoring
- Revenue: ▲USD 252 million (2025)
- Net income: ▲USD 32.2 million (2025)
- Website: www.innodata.com

Innodata Inc., formerly Innodata Isogen, Inc., is an American company that provides business process, technology and consulting services. The company also provides products that aim to help clients create, manage, use and distribute digital information.

As of June 2012, Innodata has a client base that includes many media, publishing and information services companies, as well as enterprises in information-intensive industries such as aerospace, defense, financial services and government.

Founded in 1988, Innodata employs more than 5,000 people worldwide. It is headquartered in Ridgefield Park, NJ, and has additional offices in Europe, Israel, India, the Philippines, Sri Lanka and a business presence in China.

== History ==
Innodata was founded in 1988 in New York City to provide digitized content and created quality assurance and audit procedures.

By 1992, the year the company went public, Innodata had grown to more than 1,000 employees worldwide. Throughout the decade, the company opened major facilities in the Philippines, Sri Lanka and India.

The company tripled its revenue to $60 million from $20 million between 1999 and 2001.

Innodata acquired Isogen International in 2001 and integrated both of the company's content management and publishing technologies, structured information standards and outsourcing services. In 2003, the name of Innodata Isogen Inc. was formally adopted by the company.

In 2007, the company started taking advantage of the growing popularity of e-books to become a producer of technology and processes for transforming books into e-book formats for distribution and sell-through on tablets and e-readers. Innodata has produced over 1.2 million e-books and is distributing more than 1,500 e-books per day across 25 global platforms and e-bookstores.

== Innodata Data Solutions (IADS) ==
In 2011, the company launched a new segment, Innodata Advanced Data Solutions, to develop products intended to help companies outside the information and publishing industries adopt digital and mobile devices. Within this segment, they started two new subsidiaries, Synodex and DocGenix.

In 2012, the company changed its name back to “Innodata”. This move became official on June 5, 2012, when Innodata's stockholders approved an amendment to the company's Certificate of Incorporation to change the company's name from “Innodata Isogen, Inc.” to “Innodata Inc.”

In July 2014, Innodata acquired MediaMiser Ltd. (“MediaMiser”), a media monitoring and analysis company based in Ottawa, Ontario, Canada that provides software and professional services for public relations and marketing professionals.

In December 2014, Innodata acquired intellectual property and related assets of Bulldog Reporter, a PR company.
