= Page header =

Text that is separated from the body text and appears at the top of a page

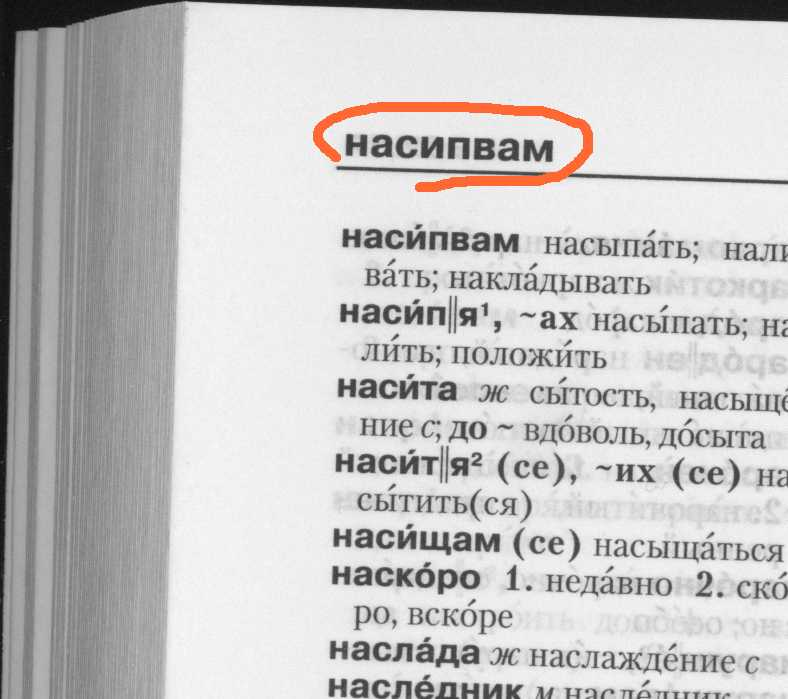
Header in a dictionary, consisting of a guide word.

In typography and word processing, a page header (or simply header) is text that is separated from the body text and appears at the top of a printed page. Word-processing programs usually allow for the configuration of page headers, which are typically identical throughout a work except in aspects such as page numbers. [ The counterpart at the bottom of the page is called a page footer (or simply footer); its content is typically similar and often complementary to that of the page header.

In publishing and certain types of academic writing, a running head, less often called a running header, running headline or running title, is a header that appears on each standard page. Running heads do not usually appear on display pages such as title pages, or on other front or back matter. Running heads in a book typically consist of the title on the left-hand (verso) page, and the chapter title on the right-hand (recto) page; or the chapter title on the verso and subsection title/subhead on the recto, aiding the reader's navigation by showing what content exists within the two-page spread at hand.

A special case of the latter is in dictionaries, whose running heads are called guide words; they show the first headword and last headword on each page, to expedite the reader's navigation to a desired headword. In academic writing, the running head usually contains the page number along with the author's last name, or an abbreviated version of the title. The counterpart of the running head is the running foot.

== Gallery ==
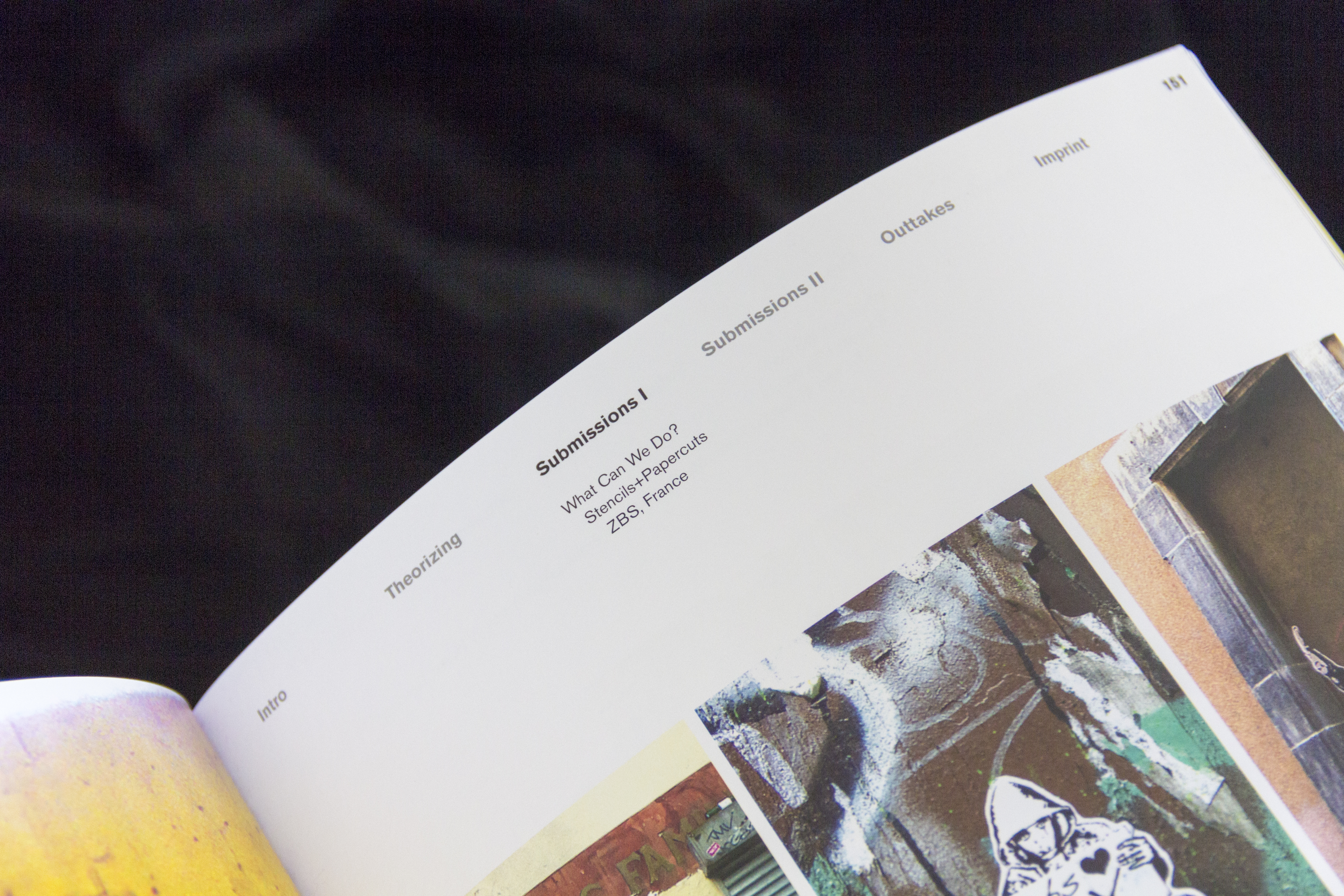
Header with highlighted current chapter title

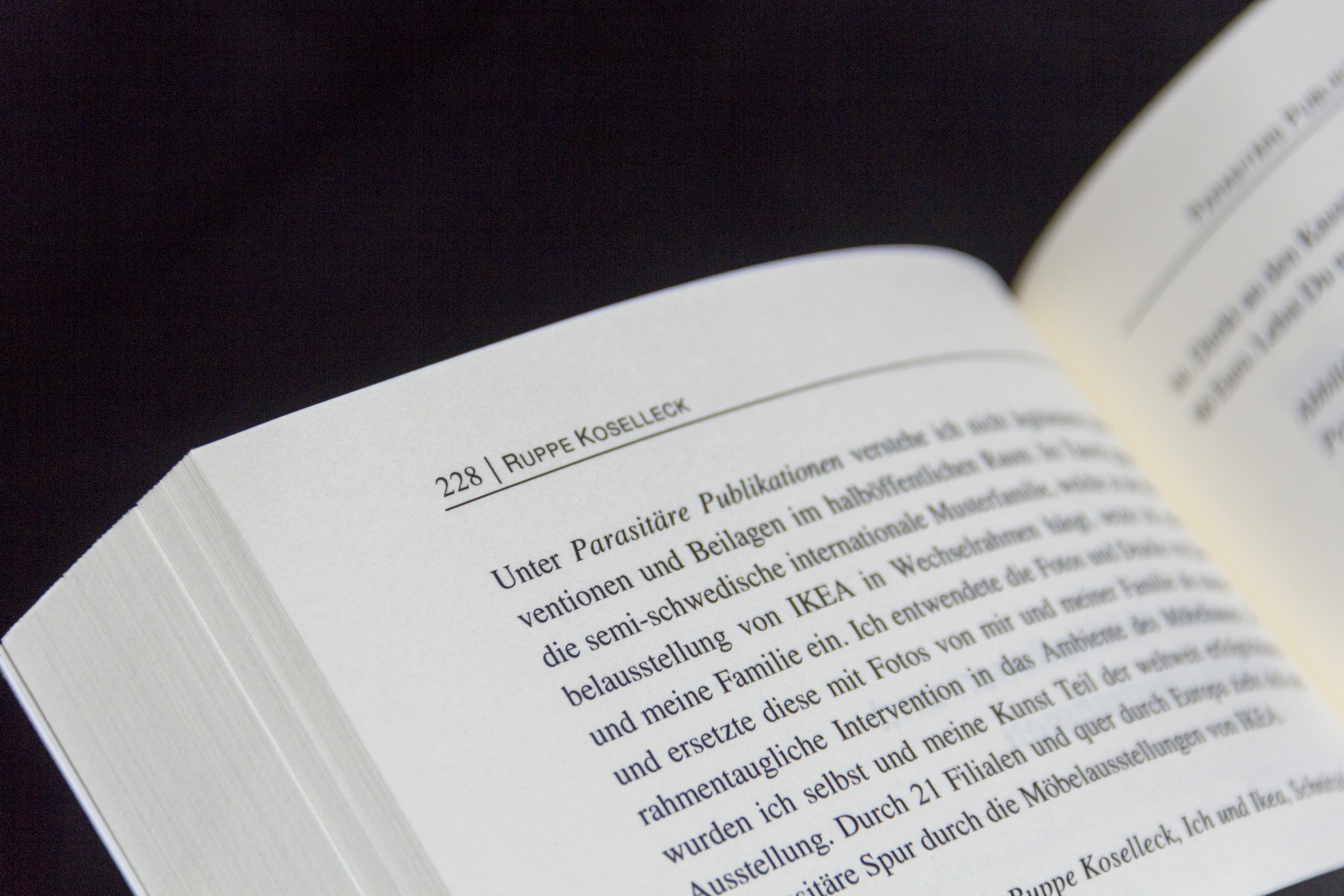
Header with the author's name and pagination

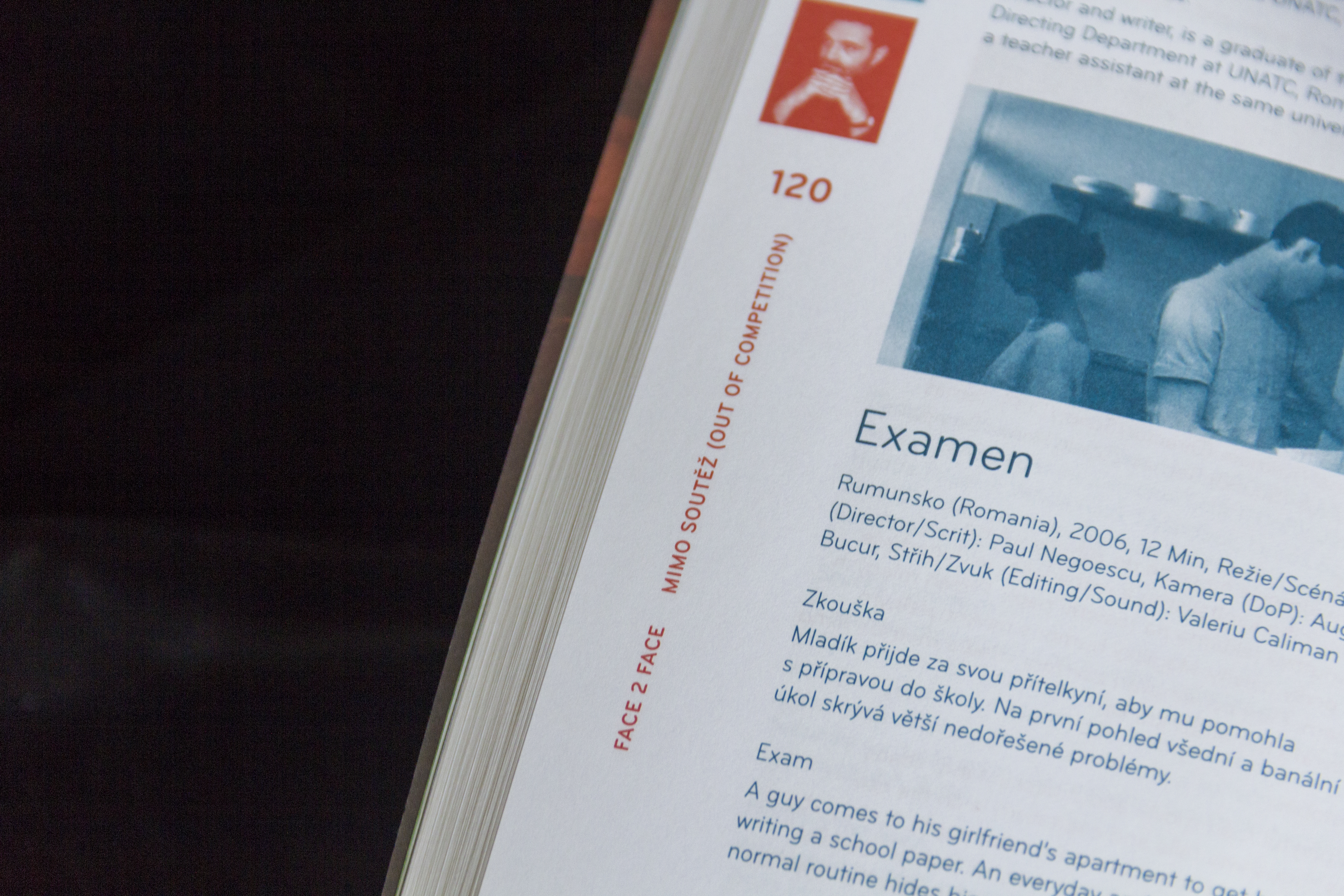
Header placed on the left hand side of page

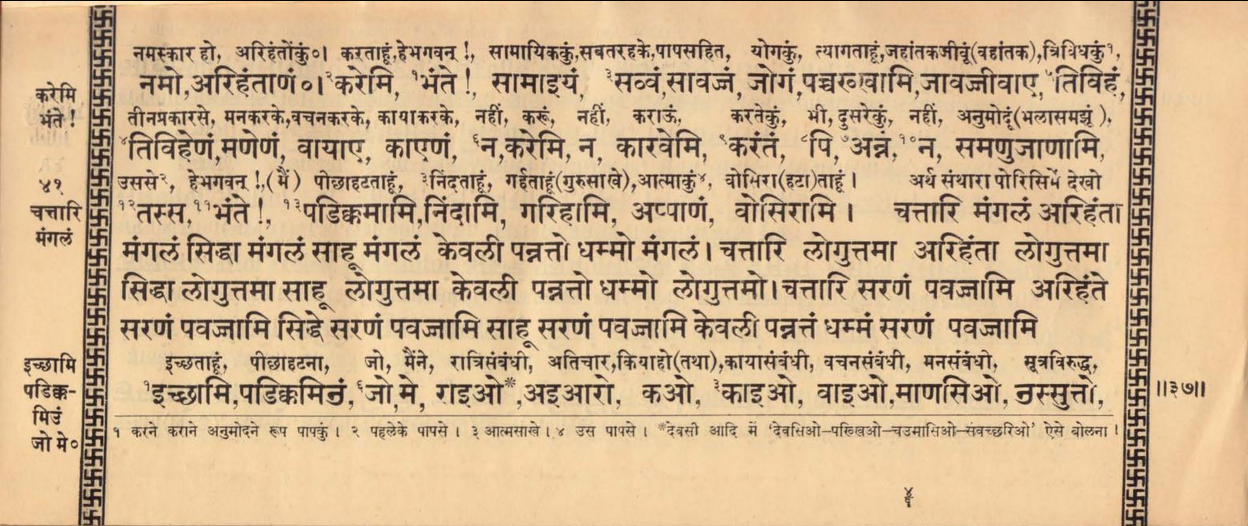
Header placed on the left hand side of page, pothi format

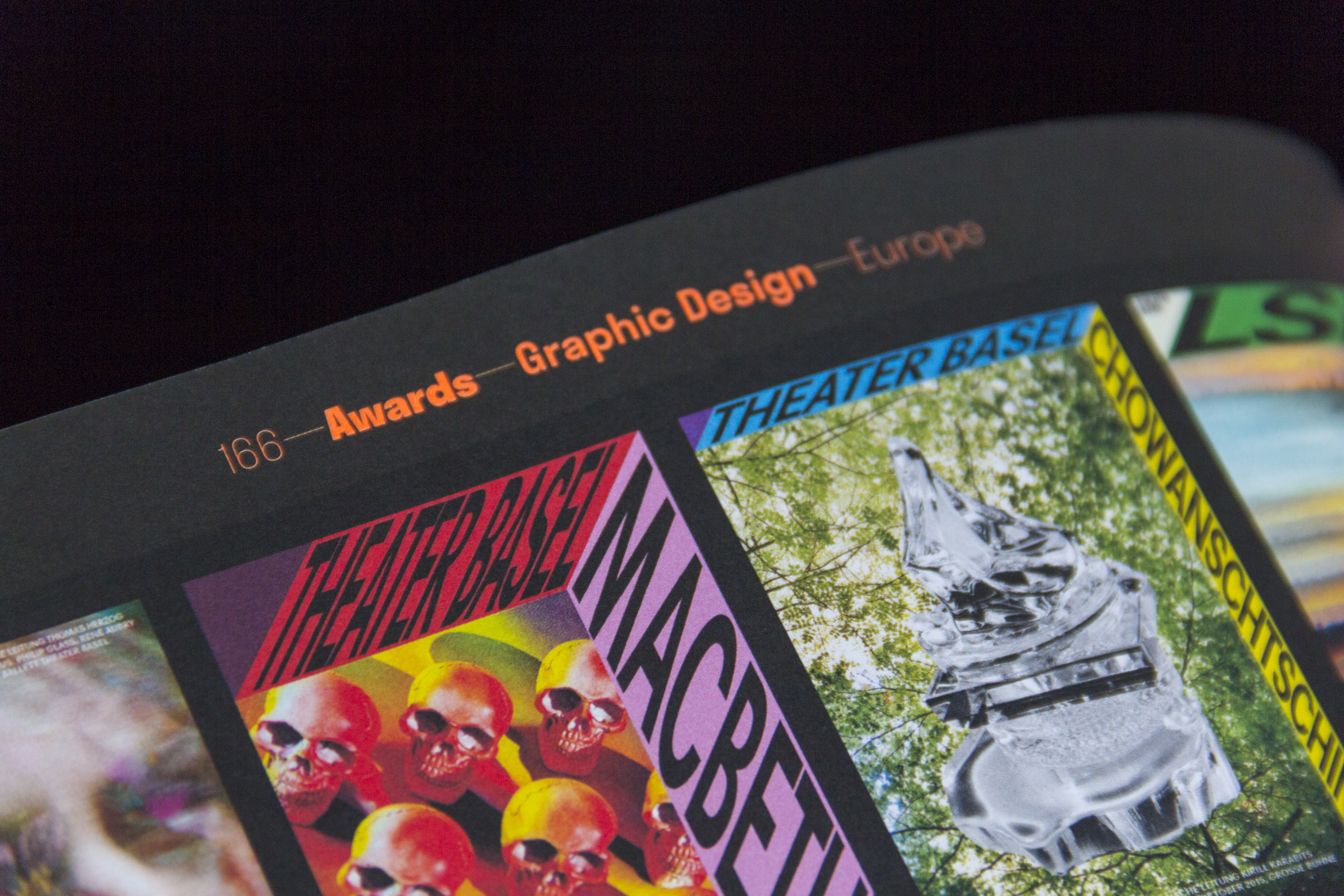

== See also ==
- Headpiece (book illustration)
