= Acronym =

Abbreviation consisting of initial letters of a phrase

NASA is an acronym that expands to National Aeronautics and Space Administration.

An acronym is an abbreviation formed using the initial letters of a multi-word name or phrase. Acronyms are often spelled with the initial letter of each word in all caps with no punctuation.

In English, the word is used in two ways. In the narrow sense, an acronym is a sequence of letters (representing the initial letters of words in a phrase) when pronounced together as a single word, like NASA, NATO, or laser. In the broad sense, the term includes this kind of sequence when pronounced letter by letter (such as GDP or USA). Sources that differentiate the two often call the former acronyms and the latter initialisms or alphabetisms. However, acronym is popularly used to refer to either concept, and both senses of the term are attributed as far back as the 1940s. Dictionary and style-guide editors dispute whether the term acronym can be legitimately applied to abbreviations which are not pronounced as words, and there is no general agreement on standard acronym spacing, casing, and punctuation.

The phrase that the acronym stands for is called its expansion. The meaning of an acronym includes both its expansion and the meaning of its expansion.

== Etymology ==
The word acronym is formed from the Greek roots akro-, meaning 'height, summit, or tip', and -nym, 'name'. This neoclassical compound appears to have originated in German, with attestations for the German form Akronym appearing as early as 1921. Citations in English date to a 1940 translation of a novel by the German writer Lion Feuchtwanger.

== Dispute over the scope of acronym ==
English lexicography and style guides differ on whether acronym should apply only to abbreviations pronounced as ordinary words or also to letter-by-letter initialisms. Some authorities accept or record the broader sense; others restrict acronym to word-pronounced forms and prefer initialism (or simply abbreviation) for the rest. Among sources that acknowledge the broader sense, attitudes range from neutral recording to prescriptive criticism. (Note: Quotations from dictionary entries and usage notes are provided in the references for readers who need the exact wording.)

=== Dictionaries ===
Some mainstream English dictionaries from across the English-speaking world affirm a sense of acronym that does not require its pronunciation as a word. American English dictionaries such as Merriam-Webster, Dictionary.com's Random House Webster's Unabridged Dictionary and the American Heritage Dictionary as well as the British Oxford English Dictionary and the Australian Macquarie Dictionary all include a sense in their entries for acronym equating it with initialism, although The American Heritage Dictionary criticizes it with the label "usage problem". However, many English language dictionaries, such as the Collins COBUILD Advanced Dictionary, Cambridge Advanced Learner's Dictionary, Macmillan Dictionary, Longman Dictionary of Contemporary English, New Oxford American Dictionary, Webster's New World Dictionary, and Lexico from Oxford University Press do not acknowledge such a sense.

=== Style and usage guides ===
English language usage and style guides which have entries for acronym generally criticize the usage that refers to forms that are not pronounceable words. Fowler's Dictionary of Modern English Usage says that acronym "denotes abbreviations formed from initial letters of other words and pronounced as a single word, such as NATO (as distinct from B-B-C)" but adds later "In everyday use, acronym is often applied to abbreviations that are technically initialisms, since they are pronounced as separate letters." The Chicago Manual of Style acknowledges the complexity ("Furthermore, an acronym and initialism are occasionally combined (JPEG), and the line between initialism and acronym is not always clear") but still defines the terms as mutually exclusive. Other guides outright deny any legitimacy to the usage: Bryson's Dictionary of Troublesome Words says "Abbreviations that are not pronounced as words (IBM, ABC, NFL) are not acronyms; they are just abbreviations." Garner's Modern American Usage says "An acronym is made from the first letters or parts of a compound term. It's read or spoken as a single word, not letter by letter." The New York Times Manual of Style and Usage says "Unless pronounced as a word, an abbreviation is not an acronym."

In contrast, some style guides do support it, whether explicitly or implicitly. The 1994 edition of Merriam-Webster's Dictionary of English Usage defends the usage on the basis of a claim that dictionaries do not make a distinction. The BuzzFeed style guide describes CBS and PBS as "acronyms ending in S".

=== Historical development and early usage ===
Most of the dictionary entries and style guide recommendations regarding the term acronym in the twentieth century did not explicitly acknowledge or support the expansive sense. The Merriam–Webster's Dictionary of English Usage from 1994 is one of the earliest publications to advocate for the expansive sense, and all the major dictionary editions that include a sense of acronym equating it with initialism were first published in the twenty-first century. The trend among dictionary editors appears to be towards including a sense defining acronym as initialism: the Merriam-Webster's Collegiate Dictionary added such a sense in its 11th edition in 2003, and both the Oxford English Dictionary and The American Heritage Dictionary added such senses in their 2011 editions. The 1989 edition of the Oxford English Dictionary only included the exclusive sense for acronym and its earliest citation was from 1943. In early December 2010, Duke University researcher Stephen Goranson published a citation for acronym to the American Dialect Society e-mail discussion list which refers to PGN being pronounced "pee-gee-enn", antedating English language usage of the word to 1940. Linguist Ben Zimmer then mentioned this citation in his December 16, 2010 "On Language" column about acronyms in The New York Times Magazine. By 2011, the publication of the 3rd edition of the Oxford English Dictionary added the expansive sense to its entry for acronym and included the 1940 citation. As the Oxford English Dictionary structures the senses in order of chronological development, it now gives the "initialism" sense first.

== Examples ==
- Pronounced as letters
  - ABC: "American Broadcasting Company"
  - BBC: "British Broadcasting Corporation"
  - DVD: "Digital Video Disc"
  - OEM: "original equipment manufacturer"
  - VHF: "very high frequency"
- Pronounced as word; initials only
  - NATO: "North Atlantic Treaty Organization"
  - Scuba: "self-contained underwater breathing apparatus"
  - Laser: "light amplification by stimulated emission of radiation"
  - GIF: "graphics interchange format"
- Pronounced as word; initials and non-initials
  - Amphetamine: "alpha-methyl-phenethylamine"
  - Gestapo: German Geheime Staatspolizei ('secret state police')
  - Radar: "radio detection and ranging"
  - Lidar: "light detection and ranging"
- Pronounced as combination of word and letters
  - CD-ROM: (cee-dee-/rɒm/) "compact disc read-only memory"
  - IUPAC: (i-u-/pæk/ or i-u-pee-a-cee) "International Union of Pure and Applied Chemistry"
  - JPEG: (jay-/pɛɡ/ or jay-pee-e-gee) "Joint Photographic Experts Group"
  - SFMOMA: (ess-ef-/ˈmoʊmə/ or ess-ef-em-o-em-a) "San Francisco Museum of Modern Art"
- Pronounced as shortcut phrase of letters
  - AAA:
    - (Triple-A) "American Automobile Association"; "abdominal aortic aneurysm"; "anti-aircraft artillery"; "Asistencia, Asesoría y Administración"
    - (Three-As) "Amateur Athletic Association"
  - IEEE: (I triple-E) "Institute of Electrical and Electronics Engineers"
  - NAACP: (N double-A C P or N A A C P) "National Association for the Advancement of Colored People"
  - NCAA: (N C double-A or N C two-A or N C A A) "National Collegiate Athletic Association"
- Shortcut incorporated into spelling
  - 3M: (three M) originally "Minnesota Mining and Manufacturing Company"
  - W3C: (W-three C) "World Wide Web Consortium"
  - A2DP: (A-two D P) "Advanced Audio Distribution Profile"
  - I18N: ("18" stands in for the word's middle eighteen letters, "nternationalizatio") "Internationalization"
  - C4ISTAR: (C-four Istar) "Command, Control, Communications, Computers, Intelligence, Surveillance, Target Acquisition, and Reconnaissance"
- Mnemonic (memory-aid)
  - KISS: "keep it simple, stupid", a design principle preferring simplicity
  - SMART: "specific, measurable, assignable, realistic, time-related", a principle of setting of goals and objectives
  - FAST: "facial drooping, arm weakness, speech difficulties, time", helps detect and enhance responsiveness to the needs of a person having a stroke
  - DRY: "don't repeat yourself", a principle of software development aimed at reducing repetition of software patterns
- Multi-layered
  - AIM: "AOL Instant Messenger", in which "AOL" originally stood for "America Online"
  - AFTA: "ASEAN Free Trade Area", where ASEAN stands for "Association of Southeast Asian Nations"
  - GIMP: "GNU image manipulation program"
- Recursive
  - GNU: "GNU's not Unix!"
  - Wine: "Wine is not an emulator"
  - HURD: "HIRD of Unix-replacing daemons", where "HIRD" stands for "HURD of interfaces representing depth"
- Gramograms, pseudo-acronyms
  - CQ: cee-cue for "seek you", a code used by radio operators
  - IOU: i-o-u for "I owe you"
  - K9: kay-nine for "canine", used to designate police units using dogs
- RAS syndrome phrases
  - ATM machine: "automated teller machine machine"
  - HIV virus: "human immunodeficiency virus virus"
  - LCD display: "liquid-crystal display display"
  - PIN number: "personal identification number number"

== Historical and current use ==
Acronymy, like retronymy, is a linguistic process that has existed throughout history but for which there was little to no naming, conscious attention, or systematic analysis until relatively recent times. Like retronymy, it became much more common in the twentieth century than it had formerly been.

Ancient examples of acronymy (before the term "acronym" was invented) include the following:

- Acronyms were used in Rome before the Christian era. For example, the official name for the Roman Empire, and the Republic before it, was abbreviated as SPQR (Senatus Populusque Romanus). Inscriptions dating from antiquity, both on stone and on coins, use many abbreviations and acronyms to save space and work. For example, Roman first names, of which there was only a small set, were almost always abbreviated. Common terms were abbreviated too, such as writing just "F" for filius, meaning "son", a very common part of memorial inscriptions mentioning people. Grammatical markers were abbreviated or left out entirely if they could be inferred from the rest of the text.
- So-called nomina sacra ('sacred names') were used in many Greek biblical manuscripts. The common words God (Θεός), Jesus (Ιησούς), Christ (Χριστός), and some others, would be abbreviated by their first and last letters, marked with an overline. This was just one of many kinds of conventional scribal abbreviation, used to reduce the time-consuming workload of the scribe and save on valuable writing materials. The same convention is still commonly used in the inscriptions on religious icons and the stamps used to mark the eucharistic bread in Eastern Churches.
- The early Christians in Rome used the image of a fish as a symbol for Jesus in part because of an acronym (or backronym): 'fish' in Greek is ichthys (ΙΧΘΥΣ), which was construed to stand for Ἰησοῦς Χριστός Θεοῦ Υἱός Σωτήρ (Iesous Christos Theou huios Soter: 'Jesus Christ, God's Son, Savior'). This interpretation dates from the second and third centuries and is preserved in the catacombs of Rome. Another ancient acronym for Jesus is the inscription INRI over the crucifix, for the Latin Iesus Nazarenus Rex Iudaeorum ('Jesus the Nazarene, King of the Jews').
- Hebrew has a millennia-long history of acronyms pronounced as words. Along with theophoric parallels to the Greek described above, Talmudic sages as early as Rabbi Yehuda shorten the ten plagues to דצ"ך עד"ש באח"ב, the order of blessings to יקנה"ז, etc., for the sake of mnemonic. The rishonic period saw Hebrew acronymy expand to a lexicon of many hundreds, including every type of word and extending to proper nouns: almost all Medieval rabbis are known by acronyms like Rashi and Rambam.

During the mid- to late nineteenth century, acronyms became a trend among American and European businessmen: abbreviating corporation names, such as on the sides of railroad cars (e.g., "Richmond, Fredericksburg and Potomac Railroad" → "RF&P"); on the sides of barrels and crates and newspaper stock listings (e.g. American Telephone and Telegraph Company → AT&T). Some well-known commercial examples dating from the 1890s through 1920s include "Nabisco" ("National Biscuit Company"), "Esso" (from "S.O.", from "Standard Oil"), and "Sunoco" ("Sun Oil Company").

Another field for the adoption of acronyms was modern warfare, with its many highly technical terms. While there is no recorded use of military acronyms dating from the American Civil War (acronyms such as "ANV" for "Army of Northern Virginia" post-date the war itself), they became somewhat common in World War I, and by World War II they were widespread even in the slang of soldiers, who referred to themselves as G.I.s.

The widespread, frequent use of acronyms across the whole range of linguistic registers is relatively new in most languages, becoming increasingly evident since the mid-twentieth century. As literacy spread and technology produced a constant stream of new and complex terms, abbreviations became increasingly convenient. The Oxford English Dictionary (OED) records the first printed use of the word initialism as occurring in 1899, but it did not come into general use until 1965, well after acronym had become common.

In English, acronyms pronounced as words may be a twentieth-century phenomenon. Linguist David Wilton in Word Myths: Debunking Linguistic Urban Legends claims that "forming words from acronyms is a distinctly twentieth- (and now twenty-first-) century phenomenon. There is only one known pre-twentieth-century [English] word with an acronymic origin and it was in vogue for only a short time in 1886. The word is colinderies or colinda, an acronym for the Colonial and Indian Exposition held in London in that year." However, although acronymic words seem not to have been employed in general vocabulary before the twentieth century (as Wilton points out), the concept of their formation is treated as effortlessly understood (and evidently not novel) in an Edgar Allan Poe story of the 1830s, "How to Write a Blackwood Article", which includes the contrived acronym "P.R.E.T.T.Y.B.L.U.E.B.A.T.C.H."

=== Early examples in English ===
The use of Latin and Neo-Latin terms in vernaculars has been pan-European and pre-dates modern English. Some examples of acronyms in this class are:

- A.M. (from Latin ante meridiem, 'before noon') and P.M. (from Latin post meridiem, 'after noon')
- A.D. (from Latin Anno Domini, 'in the year of our Lord'), whose complement in English, B.C. (Before Christ), is English-sourced

The earliest example of a word derived from an acronym listed by the OED is "abjud" (now "abjad"), formed from the original first four letters of the Arabic alphabet in the late eighteenth century in a similar manner to the English word alphabet being formed of the first two letters of the Greek alphabet. Some acrostics pre-date this, however, such as the Restoration witticism arranging the names of some members of Charles II's Committee for Foreign Affairs to produce the "CABAL" ministry.

OK, a term of disputed origin, dates back at least to the early nineteenth century and is now used around the world.

=== Current use ===
Acronyms are used most often to abbreviate names of organizations and long or frequently referenced terms. The armed forces and government agencies frequently employ acronyms; some well-known examples from the United States are among the "alphabet agencies" (jokingly referred to as "alphabet soup") created under the New Deal by Franklin D. Roosevelt (himself known as "FDR"). Business and industry also coin acronyms prolifically. The rapid advance of science and technology also drives the usage, as new inventions and concepts with multiword names create a demand for shorter, more pronounceable names. One representative example, from the U.S. Navy, is "COMCRUDESPAC", which stands for "commander, cruisers destroyers Pacific"; it is also seen as "ComCruDesPac". Inventors are encouraged to anticipate the formation of acronyms by making new terms "YABA-compatible" ("yet another bloody acronym"), meaning the term's acronym can be pronounced and is not an offensive word: "When choosing a new name, be sure it is 'YABA-compatible'."

Acronym use has been further popularized by text messaging on mobile phones with short message service (SMS), and instant messenger (IM). To fit messages into the 160-character SMS limit, and to save time, acronyms such as "GF" ("girlfriend"), "LOL" ("laughing out loud"), and "DL" ("download" or "down low") have become popular. Some prescriptivists disdain texting acronyms and abbreviations as decreasing clarity, or as failure to use "pure" or "proper" English. Others point out that languages have always continually changed, and argue that acronyms should be embraced as inevitable, or as innovation that adapts the language to changing circumstances. In this view, the modern practice is just the "proper" English of the current generation of speakers, much like the earlier abbreviation of corporation names on ticker tape or newspapers.

Exact pronunciation of "word acronyms" (those pronounced as words rather than sounded out as individual letters) often vary by speaker population. These may be regional, occupational, or generational differences, or simply personal preference. For instance, there have been decades of online debate about how to pronounce GIF (/ɡɪf/ or /dʒɪf/) and BIOS (/ˈbaɪoʊs/, /ˈbaɪoʊz/, or /ˈbaɪɒs/). Similarly, some letter-by-letter initialisms may become word acronyms over time, especially in combining forms: IP for Internet Protocol is generally said as two letters, but IPsec for Internet Protocol Security is usually pronounced as /ˌaɪˈpiːsɛk/ or /ˈɪpsɛk/, along with variant capitalization like "IPSEC" and "Ipsec". Pronunciation may even vary within a single speaker's vocabulary, depending on narrow contexts. As an example, the database programming language SQL is usually said as three letters, but in reference to Microsoft's implementation is traditionally pronounced like the word sequel.

==== Expansion at first use ====
In writing for a broad audience, the words of an acronym are typically written out in full at its first occurrence within a given text. Expansion at first use (EAFU) benefits readers unfamiliar with the acronym.

Another text aid is an abbreviation key which lists and expands all acronyms used, a reference for readers who skipped past the first use. (This is especially important for paper media, where no search utility is available to find the first use.) It also gives students a convenient review list to memorize the important acronyms introduced in a textbook chapter.

Expansion at first use and abbreviation keys originated in the print era, but they are equally useful for electronic text.

==== Jargon ====
While acronyms provide convenience and succinctness for specialists, they often degenerate into confusing jargon. This may be intentional, to exclude readers without domain-specific knowledge. New acronyms may also confuse when they coincide with an already existing acronym having a different meaning.

Medical literature has been struggling to control the proliferation of acronyms, including efforts by the American Academy of Dermatology.

==== As mnemonics ====
Acronyms are often taught as mnemonic devices: for example the colors of the rainbow are ROY G. BIV (red, orange, yellow, green, blue, indigo, violet). They are also used as mental checklists: in aviation GUMPS stands for gas-undercarriage-mixture-propeller-seat belts. Other mnemonic acronyms include HOMES (for the North American Great Lakes) in geography, PAVPANIC in English grammar, and PEMDAS/BODMAS in mathematics.

==== Acronyms as legendary etymology ====
It is not uncommon for acronyms to be cited in a kind of false etymology, called a folk etymology, for a word. Such etymologies persist in popular culture but have no factual basis in historical linguistics, and are examples of language-related urban legends. For example, "cop" is commonly cited as being derived, it is presumed, from "constable on patrol", and "posh" from "port outward, starboard home". With some of these specious expansions, the "belief" that the etymology is acronymic has clearly been tongue-in-cheek among many citers, as with "gentlemen only, ladies forbidden" for "golf", although many other (more credulous) people have uncritically taken it for fact. Taboo words in particular commonly have such false etymologies: "shit" from "ship/store high in transit" or "special high-intensity training" and "fuck" from "for unlawful carnal knowledge", or "fornication under consent/command of the king".

==== Overuse ====
The overuse of acronyms has become commonplace, causing a confusing cacophony because they are by nature not self-explanatory. Excessive acronyms can become a barrier to effective communication, for example when plain English words will suffice, or when too many acronyms burden people's memories. Likewise, when the same acronym has multiple meanings, or when an acronym is created for its own sake rather than because it assists communication, then people should think twice about using that acronym. Acronyms can even become dangerous if they give a false impression of benefit, for example in the context of medical research where, "research subjects, or parents of children who may be research subjects, overestimate the potential benefits of the research study and underestimate the potential risks...."

According to English Professor Robert A. Day, "The overuse of acronyms has become so commonplace that it has led to the formation of the Acronym Sense Society (ASS), an organization created to oppose the widespread overuse of acronyms (WOA)." In a similar vein, Dr. Alan Isles has conjured up the Acronym Suppression Society (ASS) of which he is a member, and Isles says that excessive love of acronyms is similar to an ailment, which he calls Treatment Resistant Acronym Syndrome in Humans (TRASH).

== Orthographic styling ==
=== Punctuation ===
==== Showing the ellipsis of letters ====
In English, abbreviations have previously been marked by a wide variety of punctuation. Obsolete forms include using an overbar or colon to show the ellipsis of letters following the initial part. The forward slash is still common in many dialects for some fixed expressions—such as in w/ for "with" or A/C for "air conditioning"—while only infrequently being used to abbreviate new terms. The apostrophe is common for grammatical contractions (e.g. don't, y'all, and ain't) and for contractions marking unusual pronunciations (e.g. a'ight, cap'n, and fo'c'sle for "all right", "captain", and "forecastle"). By the early twentieth century, it was standard to use a full stop/period/point, especially in the cases of initialisms and acronyms. Previously, especially for Latin abbreviations, this was done with a full space between every full word (e.g. A. D., i. e., and e. g. for "Anno Domini", "id est", and "exempli gratia"). This even included punctuation after both Roman and Arabic numerals to indicate their use in place of the full names of each number (e.g. LII. or 52. in place of "fifty-two" and "1/4." or "1./4." to indicate "one-fourth"). Both conventions have fallen out of common use in all dialects of English, except in places where an Arabic decimal includes a medial decimal point.

Particularly in British and Commonwealth English, all such punctuation marking acronyms and other capitalized abbreviations is now uncommon and considered either unnecessary or incorrect. The presence of all-capital letters is now thought sufficient to indicate the nature of the UK, the EU, and the UN. Forms such as the U.S.A. for "the United States of America" are now considered to indicate American or North American English. Even within those dialects, such punctuation is becoming increasingly uncommon.

===== Ellipsis-is-understood style =====
Some style guides, such as that of the BBC, no longer require punctuation to show ellipsis; some even proscribe it. Larry Trask, American author of The Penguin Guide to Punctuation, states categorically that, in British English, "this tiresome and unnecessary practice is now obsolete."

===== Pronunciation-dependent style and periods =====
Nevertheless, some influential style guides, many of them American, still require periods in certain instances. For example, The New York Times Manual of Style and Usage recommends following each segment with a period when the letters are pronounced individually, as in "K.G.B.", but not when pronounced as a word, as in "NATO". The logic of this style is that the pronunciation is reflected graphically by the punctuation scheme.

===== Other conventions =====
When a multiple-letter abbreviation is formed from a single word, periods are in general not used, although they may be common in informal usage. "TV", for example, may stand for a single word ("television", for instance), and is in general spelled without punctuation (except in the plural). Although "PS" stands for the single English word "postscript" or the Latin postscriptum, it is often spelled with periods ("P.S.") as if parsed as Latin post scriptum instead.

The slash ('/', or solidus) is sometimes used to separate the letters in an acronym, as in "N/A" ("not applicable, not available") and "c/o" ("care of").

Inconveniently long words used frequently in related contexts can be represented according to their letter count as a numeronym. For example, "i18n" abbreviates "internationalization", a computer-science term for adapting software for worldwide use; the "18" represents the 18 letters that come between the first and the last in "internationalization". Similarly, "localization" can be abbreviated "l10n"; "multilingualization" "m17n"; and "accessibility" "a11y". In addition to the use of a specific number replacing that many letters, the more general "x" can be used to replace an unspecified number of letters. Examples include "Crxn" for "crystallization" and the series familiar to physicians for history, diagnosis, and treatment ("hx", "dx", "tx"). Terms relating to a command structure may also sometimes use this formatting, for example gold, silver, and bronze levels of command in UK policing being referred to as Gx, Sx, and Bx.

==== Representing plurals and possessives ====
There is a question about how to pluralize acronyms. Often a writer will add an 's' following an apostrophe, as in "PC's". However, Kate L. Turabian's A Manual for Writers of Research Papers, Theses, and Dissertations, writing about style in academic writings, allows for an apostrophe to form plural acronyms "only when an abbreviation contains internal periods or both capital and lowercase letters". Turabian would therefore prefer "DVDs" and "URLs" but not "Ph.D.s". The style guides of the Modern Language Association and American Psychological Association prohibit apostrophes from being used to pluralize acronyms regardless of periods (so "compact discs" would be "CDs" or "C.D.s"), whereas The New York Times Manual of Style and Usage requires an apostrophe when pluralizing all abbreviations regardless of periods (preferring "PC's, TV's and VCR's").

Possessive plurals that also include apostrophes for mere pluralization and periods appear especially complex: for example, "the C.D.'s' labels" (the labels of the compact discs). In some instances, however, an apostrophe may increase clarity: for example, if the final letter of an abbreviation is "S", as in "SOS's" (although abbreviations ending with S can also take "-es", e.g. "SOSes"), or when pluralizing an abbreviation that has periods.

A particularly rich source of options arises when the plural of an acronym would normally be indicated in a word other than the final word if spelled out in full. A classic example is "Member of Parliament", which in plural is "Members of Parliament". It is possible then to abbreviate this as "M's P", which was fairly common in mid-twentieth-century Australian news writing (or similar), and used by former Australian Prime Minister Ben Chifley. This usage is less common than forms with "s" at the end, such as "MPs", and may appear dated or pedantic. In common usage, therefore, "weapons of mass destruction" becomes "WMDs", "prisoners of war" becomes "POWs", and "runs batted in" becomes "RBIs".

Abbreviations that come from single, rather than multiple, words—such as "TV" ("television")—are usually pluralized without apostrophes ("two TVs"); most writers feel that the apostrophe should be reserved for the possessive ("the TV's antenna").

In some languages, the convention of doubling the letters in the acronym is used to indicate plural words: for example, the Spanish EE.UU., for Estados Unidos ('United States'). This old convention is still sometimes followed for a limited number of English abbreviations, such as SS. for Saints, pp. for the plural of 'pages', or mss. for manuscripts.

=== Case ===
==== All-caps style ====
The most common capitalization scheme seen with acronyms is all-uppercase (all caps). Small caps are sometimes used to make the run of capital letters seem less jarring to the reader. For example, the style of some American publications, including the Atlantic Monthly and USA Today, is to use small caps for acronyms longer than three letters; thus "U.S." and "FDR" are set in normal caps, but "nato" is set in small caps. The acronyms "AD" and "BC" are often smallcapped as well, as in: "From 4004 bc to ad 525".

==== Normal case and anacronyms ====
Where an acronym has linguistically taken on an identity as regular word, the acronym may use normal case rules, e.g. it would appear generally in lower case, but with an initial capital when starting a sentence or when in a title. Once knowledge of the words underlying such an acronym has faded from common recall, the acronym may be termed an anacronym. Examples of anacronyms are the words "scuba", "radar", and "laser". The word "anacronym" should not be confused with the word "anachronym", which is a type of misnomer.

==== Mixed-case variant ====
Words derived from an acronym by affixing are typically expressed in mixed case, so the root acronym is clear. For example, "pre-WWII politics", "post-NATO world", "DNase". In some cases a derived acronym may also be expressed in mixed case. For example, "messenger RNA" and "transfer RNA" become "mRNA" and "tRNA".

==== Pronunciation-dependent style and case ====
Some publications choose to capitalize only the first letter of acronyms, reserving all-caps styling for initialisms, writing the pronounced acronyms "Nato" and "Aids" in mixed case, but the initialisms "USA" and "FBI" in all caps. For example, this is the style used in The Guardian, and BBC News typically edits to this style (though its official style guide, dating from 2003, still recommends all-caps). The logic of this style is that the pronunciation is reflected graphically by the capitalization scheme. However, it conflicts with conventional English usage of first-letter upper-casing as a marker of proper names in many cases. For example, AIDS stands for acquired immunodeficiency syndrome, which is not a proper name, while Aids is in the style of one.

Some style manuals also base the letters' case on their number. The New York Times, for example, keeps "NATO" in all capitals (while several guides in the British press may render it "Nato"), but uses lower case in "Unicef" (from "United Nations International Children's Emergency Fund") because it is more than four letters, and to style it in caps might look ungainly (flirting with the appearance of "shouting capitals").

=== Numerals and constituent words ===
While abbreviations typically exclude the initials of short function words (such as "and", "or", "of", or "to"), this is not always the case. Sometimes function words are included to make a pronounceable acronym, such as CORE (Congress of Racial Equality). Sometimes the letters representing these words are written in lower case, such as in the cases of "TfL" ("Transport for London") and LotR (The Lord of the Rings); this usually occurs when the acronym represents a multi-word proper noun.

Numbers (both cardinal and ordinal) in names are often represented by digits rather than initial letters, as in "4GL" ("fourth generation language") or "G77" ("Group of 77"). Large numbers may use metric prefixes, as with "Y2K" for "Year 2000". Exceptions using initials for numbers include "TLA" ("three-letter acronym/abbreviation") and "GoF" ("Gang of Four"). Abbreviations using numbers for other purposes include repetitions, such as "A2DP" ("Advanced Audio Distribution Profile"), "W3C" ("World Wide Web Consortium"), and T3 (Trends, Tips & Tools for Everyday Living); pronunciation, such as "B2B" ("business to business"); and numeronyms, such as "i18n" ("internationalization"; "18" represents the 18 letters between the initial "i" and the final "n").

=== Casing of expansions ===
Authors of expository writing will sometimes capitalize or otherwise distinctively format the initials of the expansion for pedagogical emphasis (for example, writing: "the onset of Congestive Heart Failure (CHF)" or "the onset of congestive heart failure (CHF)"). Capitalization like this, however, conflicts with the convention of English orthography, which generally reserves capitals in the middle of sentences for proper nouns; when following the AMA Manual of Style, this would instead be rendered as "the onset of congestive heart failure (CHF)".

== Changes to (or wordplay on) the expanded meaning ==
=== Pseudo-acronyms and orphan initialisms ===
Some apparent acronyms or other abbreviations do not stand for anything and cannot be expanded to some meaning. Such pseudo-acronyms may be pronunciation-based, such as "BBQ" (bee-bee-cue), for "barbecue", and "K9" (kay-nine) for "canine". Pseudo-acronyms also frequently develop as "orphan initialisms": an existing acronym is redefined as a non-acronymous name, severing its link to its previous meaning. For example, the letters of the "SAT", a US college entrance test originally dubbed "Scholastic Aptitude Test", no longer officially stand for anything. The US-based abortion-rights organization "NARAL" was another example of this; in that case, the organization changed its name several times, with the long-form of the name always corresponding to the letters "NARAL", later opting to simply be known by the short-form, without being connected to a long-form, and finally dropping the term to become Reproductive Freedom for All.

This is common with companies that want to retain brand recognition while moving away from an outdated image: American Telephone and Telegraph became AT&T and British Petroleum became BP. Russia Today has rebranded itself as RT. American Movie Classics has simply rebranded itself as AMC. Genzyme Transgenics Corporation became GTC Biotherapeutics, Inc.; The Learning Channel became TLC; MTV dropped the name Music Television out of its brand; and American District Telegraph became simply known as ADT. "Kentucky Fried Chicken" went partway, re-branding itself with its initialism "KFC" to de-emphasize the role of frying in the preparation of its signature dishes, though they have since returned to using both interchangeably. (Note: This change was also applied to other languages, with Poulet Frit Kentucky becoming PFK in French Canada.) The East Coast Hockey League became the ECHL when it expanded to include cities in the western United States prior to the 2003–2004 season.

Pseudo-acronyms may have advantages in international markets: for example, some national affiliates of International Business Machines are legally incorporated with "IBM" in their names (for example, IBM Canada) to avoid translating the full name into local languages. Likewise, UBS is the name of the merged Union Bank of Switzerland and Swiss Bank Corporation, and HSBC has replaced the long name Hongkong and Shanghai Banking Corporation. Some companies which have a name giving a clear indication of their place of origin will choose to use acronyms when expanding to foreign markets: for example, Toronto-Dominion Bank sometimes continues to operate under its full name in Canada, but its U.S. subsidiary is known only as TD Bank, just as Royal Bank of Canada sometimes still uses its full name in Canada (a constitutional monarchy) while its U.S. subsidiary is always only called RBC Bank. The India-based JSW Group of companies is another example of the original name (Jindal South West Group) being re-branded into a pseudo-acronym while expanding into other geographical areas in and outside of India.

=== Redundant acronyms and RAS syndrome ===
Rebranding can lead to redundant acronym syndrome, as when Trustee Savings Bank became TSB Bank, or when Railway Express Agency became REA Express. A few high-tech companies have taken the redundant acronym to the extreme: for example, ISM Information Systems Management Corp. and SHL Systemhouse Ltd. Examples in entertainment include the television shows CSI: Crime Scene Investigation and Navy: NCIS ("Navy" was dropped in the second season), where the redundancy was likely designed to educate new viewers as to what the initials stood for.

=== Redefined acronyms ===
In some cases, while the initials in an acronym may stay the same, for what those letters stand may change. Examples include the following:

- AI was originally a wellknown acronym for Amnesty International; nowadays, it refers more commonly to artificial intelligence
- DVD was originally an acronym for the unofficial term "digital video disc", but was later stated by the DVD Forum as standing for "Digital Versatile Disc"
- GAO changed the full form of its name from "General Accounting Office" to "Government Accountability Office"
- GPO changed the full form of its name from "Government Printing Office" to "Government Publishing Office"
- RAID was originally an acronym for "Redundant Array of Inexpensive Disks" but has since been redefined as "Redundant Array of Independent Disks"
- The UICC was founded as the "International Union Against Cancer", and its initials originally came from the Romance-language versions of that name (such as French Union Internationale Contre le Cancer). The English expansion of its name has since been changed to "Union for International Cancer Control" so that it would also correspond to the UICC acronym.
- WWF was originally an acronym for "World Wildlife Fund", but now stands for "World Wide Fund for Nature" (although the organization's branches in the U.S. and Canada still use the original name)

=== Backronyms ===
A backronym (or bacronym) is a phrase that is constructed "after the fact" from a previously existing word. For example, the novelist and critic Anthony Burgess once proposed that the word "book" ought to stand for "box of organized knowledge". A classic real-world example of this is the name of the predecessor to the Apple Macintosh, the Apple Lisa, which was said to refer to "Local Integrated Software Architecture", but was actually named after Steve Jobs' daughter, born in 1978.

=== Contrived acronyms ===
Contrived acronyms are deliberately designed to be apt for the thing being named (by having a dual meaning or by borrowing the positive connotations of an existing word). Some examples of contrived acronyms are USA PATRIOT, CAN SPAM, CAPTCHA, DOGE and ACT UP. The clothing company French Connection began referring to itself as fcuk, standing for "French Connection United Kingdom". The company then created T-shirts and several advertising campaigns that exploit the acronym's similarity to the taboo word "fuck". Contrived acronyms find frequent use as names of fictional agencies, with a famous example being frequent James Bond antagonist organization SPECTRE (Special Executive for Counterintelligence, Terrorism, Revenge and Extortion) and Marvel's S.H.I.E.L.D. (re-defined multiple times, Strategic Homeland Intervention, Enforcement and Logistics Division in the Marvel Cinematic Universe).

The U.S. Department of Defense's Defense Advanced Research Projects Agency (DARPA) is known for developing contrived acronyms to name projects, including RESURRECT, NIRVANA, and DUDE. In July 2010, Wired magazine reported that DARPA announced programs to "transform biology from a descriptive to a predictive field of science" named BATMAN and ROBIN for "Biochronicity and Temporal Mechanisms Arising in Nature" and "Robustness of Biologically-Inspired Networks", a reference to comic-book superheroes Batman and Robin.

The short-form names of clinical trials and other scientific studies constitute a large class of acronyms that includes many contrived examples, as well as many with a partial rather than complete correspondence of letters to expansion components. These trials tend to have full names that are accurately descriptive of what the trial is about but are thus also too long to serve practically as names within the syntax of a sentence, so a short name is also developed, which can serve as a syntactically useful handle and also provide at least a degree of mnemonic reminder as to the full name. Examples widely known in medicine include the ALLHAT trial (Antihypertensive and Lipid-Lowering Treatment to Prevent Heart Attack Trial) and the CHARM trial (Candesartan in Heart Failure: Assessment of Reduction in Mortality and Morbidity).

The fact that RAS syndrome is often involved, as well as that the letters often do not entirely match, have sometimes been pointed out by annoyed researchers preoccupied by the idea that because the archetypal form of acronyms originated with one-to-one letter matching, there must be some impropriety in their ever deviating from that form. However, the purpose of clinical trial acronyms, as with gene and protein symbols, is simply to have a syntactically usable and easily recalled short name to complement the long name that is often syntactically unusable and not memorized. It is useful for the short name to give a reminder of the long name, which supports the reasonable censure of "cutesy" examples that provide little to no hint of it. But beyond that reasonably close correspondence, the short name's chief utility is in functioning cognitively as a name, rather than being a cryptic and forgettable string, albeit faithful to the matching of letters.

Other reasonable critiques have been (1) that it is irresponsible to mention trial acronyms without explaining them at least once by providing the long names somewhere in the document, and (2) that the proliferation of trial acronyms has resulted in ambiguity, such as three different trials all called ASPECT, which is another reason why failing to explain them somewhere in the document is irresponsible in scientific communication. At least one study has evaluated the citation impact and other traits of acronym-named trials compared with others, finding both good aspects (mnemonic help, name recall) and potential flaws (connotatively driven bias).

Some acronyms are chosen deliberately to avoid a name considered undesirable: For example, Verliebt in Berlin (ViB), a German telenovela, was first intended to be Alles nur aus Liebe ('All for Love'), but was changed to avoid the resultant acronym ANAL. Likewise, the Computer Literacy and Internet Technology qualification is known as CLaIT, rather than CLIT. In Canada, the Canadian Conservative Reform Alliance (Party) was quickly renamed to the "Canadian Reform Conservative Alliance" when its opponents pointed out that its initials spelled CCRAP (pronounced "see crap"). Two Irish institutes of technology (Galway and Tralee) chose different acronyms from other institutes when they were upgraded from regional technical colleges. Tralee RTC became the Institute of Technology Tralee (ITT), as opposed to Tralee Institute of Technology (TIT). Galway RTC became Galway-Mayo Institute of Technology (GMIT), as opposed to Galway Institute of Technology (GIT). The charity sports organization Team in Training is known as "TNT" and not "TIT". Technological Institute of Textile & Sciences, however, is still known as "TITS". George Mason University was planning to name their law school the "Antonin Scalia School of Law" (ASSOL) in honor of the late Antonin Scalia, only to change it to the "Antonin Scalia Law School" later.

=== Macronyms/nested acronyms ===
A macronym, or nested acronym, is an acronym in which one or more letters stand for acronyms (or abbreviations) themselves. The word "macronym" is a portmanteau of "macro-" and "acronym".

Some examples of macronyms are:

- XHR stands for "XML HTTP Request", in which "XML" is "Extensible Markup Language", and HTTP stands for "HyperText Transfer Protocol"
- POWER stands for "Performance Optimization With Enhanced RISC", in which "RISC" stands for "reduced instruction set computer"
- VHDL stands for "VHSIC Hardware Description Language", in which "VHSIC" stands for "Very High Speed Integrated Circuit"
- XSD stands for "XML Schema Definition", in which "XML" stands for "Extensible Markup Language"
- AIM stands for "AOL Instant Messenger", in which "AOL" originally stood for "America Online"
- HASP stood for "Houston Automatic Spooling Priority", but "spooling" itself was an acronym: "simultaneous peripheral operations on-line"
- VORTAC stands for "VOR+TACAN", in which "VOR" is "VHF omnidirectional range" (where VHF = very high frequency radio) and "TAC" is short for TACAN, which stands for "tactical air navigation"
- Global Information Assurance Certification has a number of nested acronyms for its certifications, e.g. "GSEC" is an acronym for "GIAC Security Essentials"
- RBD stands for "REM Behavior Disorder", in which "REM" stands for "rapid eye movement"

Some macronyms can be multiply nested: the second-order acronym points to another one further down a hierarchy. VITAL, for example, which expands to "VHDL Initiative Towards ASIC Libraries" is a total of 15 words when fully expanded. In an informal competition run by the magazine New Scientist, a fully documented specimen was discovered that may be the most deeply nested of all: RARS is the "Regional ATOVS Retransmission Service"; ATOVS is "Advanced TOVS"; TOVS is "TIROS operational vertical sounder"; and TIROS is "Television infrared observational satellite". Fully expanded, "RARS" might thus become "Regional Advanced Television Infrared Observational Satellite Operational Vertical Sounder Retransmission Service", which would produce the much more unwieldy acronym "RATIOSOVSRS".

However, to say that "RARS" stands directly for that string of words, or can be interchanged with it in syntax (in the same way that "CHF" can be usefully interchanged with "congestive heart failure"), is a prescriptive misapprehension rather than a linguistically accurate description; the true nature of such a term is closer to anacronymic than to being interchangeable like simpler acronyms are. The latter are fully reducible in an attempt to "spell everything out and avoid all abbreviations", but the former are irreducible in that respect; they can be annotated with parenthetical explanations, but they cannot be eliminated from speech or writing in any useful or practical way. Just as the words laser and radar function as words in syntax and cognition without a need to focus on their acronymic origins, terms such as "RARS" and "CHA2DS2–VASc score" are irreducible in natural language; if they are purged, the form of language that is left may conform to some imposed rule, but it cannot be described as remaining natural. Similarly, protein and gene nomenclature, which uses symbols extensively, includes such terms as the name of the NACHT protein domain, which reflects the symbols of some proteins that contain the domain – NAIP (NLR family apoptosis inhibitor protein), C2TA (major histocompatibility complex class II transcription activator), HET-E (incompatibility locus protein from Podospora anserine), and TP1 (telomerase-associated protein) – but is not syntactically reducible to them. The name is thus itself more symbol than acronym, and its expansion cannot replace it while preserving its function in natural syntax as a name within a clause clearly parsable by human readers or listeners.

==== Recursive acronyms ====
A special type of macronym, the recursive acronym, has letters whose expansion refers back to the macronym itself. One of the earliest examples appears in The Hacker's Dictionary as MUNG, which stands for "MUNG Until No Good".

Some examples of recursive acronyms are:

- GNU stands for "GNU's Not Unix!"
- LAME stands for "LAME Ain't an MP3 Encoder"
- PHP stands for "PHP: Hypertext Preprocessor"
- WINE stands for "WINE Is Not an Emulator"
- HURD stands for "HIRD of Unix-replacing daemons", where HIRD itself stands for "HURD of interfaces representing depth" (a "mutually recursive" acronym)

== Non-English languages ==
=== Specific languages ===
==== Chinese ====
With English terminology, discussions of languages with syllabic or logographic writing systems (such as Chinese, Japanese, and Korean), "acronyms" describe the short forms that take selected characters from a multi-character word.

For example, in Chinese, 'university' (大學/大学, lit. 'great learning') is usually abbreviated simply as 大 ('great') when used with the name of the institute. So 'Peking University' (北京大学) is commonly shortened to 北大 (lit. 'north-great') by also only taking the first character of Peking, the "northern capital" (北京; Beijing). In some cases, however, other characters than the first can be selected. For example, the local short form of 'Hong Kong University' (香港大學) uses Kong (港大) rather than Hong.

==== Korean ====
Many aspects of academics in Korea follow similar acronym patterns as Chinese, owing to the two languages' commonalities, like using the word for 'big' or 'great' i.e. dae (대), to refer to universities (대학; daehak, literally 'great learning' although 'big school' is an acceptable alternate). They can be interpreted similarly to American university appellations, such as "UPenn" or "Texas Tech".

Some acronyms are shortened forms of the school's name, like how Hongik University (홍익대학교, Hongik Daehakgyo) is shortened to Hongdae (홍대, 'Hong, the big [school]' or 'Hong-U') Other acronyms can refer to the university's main subject, e.g. Korea National University of Education (한국교원대학교, Hanguk Gyowon Daehakgyo) is shortened to Gyowondae (교원대, 'Big Ed.' or 'Ed.-U'). Other schools use a Koreanized version of their English acronym. The Korea Advanced Institute of Science and Technology (한국과학기술원, Hanguk Gwahak Gisulwon) is referred to as KAIST (카이스트, Kaiseuteu) in both English and Korean. The 3 most prestigious schools in Korea are known as SKY (스카이, seukai), combining the first letter of their English names (Seoul National, Korea, and Yonsei Universities). In addition, the College Scholastic Ability Test (대학수학능력시험, Daehak Suhang Neungryeok Siheom) is shortened to Suneung (수능, 'S.A.').

==== Japanese ====
The Japanese language makes extensive use of abbreviations, but only some of these are acronyms.

Chinese-based words (Sino-Japanese vocabulary) use similar acronym formation to Chinese, like Tōdai (東大) for Tōkyō Daigaku (東京大学, Tokyo University). It is not always the case that the first character of each word is used, as in Saikyō for 埼京, from Saitama + Tōkyō (埼玉＋東京), which uses the second character of 東京.

Non-Chinese foreign borrowings (gairaigo) are instead frequently abbreviated as clipped compounds, rather than acronyms, using several initial sounds. This is visible in katakana transcriptions of foreign words, but is also found with native words (written in hiragana). For example, the Pokémon media franchise's name originally stood for "pocket monsters" (ポケット·モンスター [po-ke-tto-mon-su-tā] ポケモン), which is still the long-form of the name in Japanese, or "wāpuro" for "word processor" (ワード·プロセッサー [wā-do-pu-ro-se-ssā] ワープロ).

==== German ====
To a greater degree than English, German often uses syllabic abbreviations instead of acronyms. Some examples are Gestapo rather than GSP (for Geheime Staatspolizei, 'Secret State Police'); Flak rather than FAK (for Fliegerabwehrkanone, 'anti-aircraft gun'); and Kripo rather than KP (for Kriminalpolizei, 'detective division police'). The overuse of such contractions has been mockingly labeled Aküfi (for Abkürzungsfimmel, 'strange habit of abbreviating'). Examples of Aküfi include Vokuhila (for vorne kurz, hinten lang, 'short in the front, long in the back', i.e., a mullet haircut) and the mocking of Adolf Hitler's title as Gröfaz (Größter Feldherr aller Zeiten, 'Greatest General of all Time').

==== Hebrew ====
It is common to take more than just one initial letter from each of the words composing the acronym; regardless of this, the abbreviation sign gershayim ⟨״⟩ is always written between the second-last and last letters of the non-inflected form of the acronym, even if by this it separates letters of the same original word. Examples (keeping in mind that Hebrew reads right-to-left): ארה״ב (for ארצות הברית, the United States); ברה״מ (for ברית המועצות, the Soviet Union); ראשל״צ (for ראשון לציון, Rishon LeZion); ביה״ס (for בית הספר, the school). An example that takes only the initial letters from its component words is צה״ל (Tzahal, for צבא הגנה לישראל, Israel Defense Forces). In inflected forms, the abbreviation sign gershayim remains between the second-last and last letters of the non-inflected form of the acronym (e.g. 'report', singular: דו״ח, plural: דו״חות; 'squad commander', masculine: מ״כ, feminine: מ״כית).

==== Indonesian ====
There is also a widespread use of acronyms in Indonesia in every aspect of social life. For example, the Golkar political party stands for Partai Golongan Karya, Monas stands for Monumen Nasional ('National Monument'), the Angkot public transport stands for Angkutan Kota ('city public transportation'), warnet stands for warung internet ('internet café'), and many others. Some acronyms are considered formal (or officially adopted), while many more are considered informal, slang, or colloquial.

The capital's metropolitan area (Jakarta and its surrounding satellite regions), Jabodetabek, is another acronym. This stands for Jakarta-Bogor-Depok-Tangerang-Bekasi. Many highways are also named by the acronym method, e.g. Jalan Tol ('Toll Road'), Jagorawi (Jakarta-Bogor-Ciawi), Purbaleunyi (Purwakarta-Bandung-Cileunyi), and Joglo Semar (Jogja-Solo-Semarang).

In some languages, especially those that use certain alphabets, many acronyms come from the governmental use, particularly in the military and law enforcement services. The Indonesian military (TNI – Tentara Nasional Indonesia) and Indonesian police (POLRI – Kepolisian Republik Indonesia) are known for heavy acronyms use. Examples include the Kopassus (Komando Pasukan Khusus; 'Special Forces Command'), Kopaska (Komando Pasukan Katak; 'Frogmen Command'), Kodim (Komando Distrik Militer; 'Military District Command' – one of the Indonesian army's administrative divisions), Serka (Sersan Kepala; 'Head Sergeant'), Akmil (Akademi Militer; 'Military Academy' – in Magelang), and many other terms regarding ranks, units, divisions, procedures, etc.

==== Malaysian ====
Although not as common as in its sister language Indonesian, a number of Malaysian (Bahasa Malaysia) words are formed by merging two words, such as tadika from taman didikan kanak-kanak ('kindergarten') and pawagam from panggung wayang gambar. This, however, has been less prevalent in the modern era, in contrary to Indonesian. It is still often for names such as organisation names, among the most famous being MARA from Majlis Amanah Rakyat ('People's Trust Council'), a government agency in Malaysia.

Some acronyms are developed from the Jawi (Malay in Arabic script) spelling of the name and may not reflect its Latin counterpart such as PAS from Parti Islam Se-Malaysia ('Malaysian Islamic Party') which originated from the Jawi acronym ڤاس from ڤرتي إسلام سمليسيا, with the same pronunciation, since the first letter of the word 'Islam' in Jawi uses the letter Aleph, which is pronounced like the letter A when in such position as in the acronym.

Rules in writing initialisms in Malaysian differ based on its script. In its Latin form, the initialism would be spelt much like in English, using capitals written without any spacing, such as TNB for Tenaga Nasional Berhad.

In Jawi, however, initialisms differ depending on the source language. For Malay initialisms, the initial Jawi letters would be written separated by a period such as د.ب.ڤ for ديوان بهاس دان ڤوستاک. If the initialism is from a different language, however, it would be written by transliterating each letter from the original language, such as عيم.سي.عيم.سي. for MCMC, or الفا.ڤي.ثيتا for Α.Π.Θ.

==== Russian ====
Acronyms that use parts of words (not necessarily syllables) are commonplace in Russian as well, e.g. Газпром (Gazprom), for Газовая промышленность (Gazovaya promyshlennost, 'gas industry'). There are also initialisms, such as СМИ ('SMI', for средства массовой информации sredstva massovoy informatsii), 'means of mass informing'; ГУЛаг (GULag) combines two initials and three letters of the final word: it stands for Главное управление лагерей (Glavnoe upravlenie lagerey, 'Chief Administration of Camps'). Most commonly they are pronounced as words, unless they lack vowels, in which case they are pronounced by letters e.g. ФСБ (ef-es-beh, 'FSB'), США (seh-sheh-ah, USA). Some foreigh acronyms became own words, such as айти (IT) and пиар (PR).

Historically, OTMA was an acronym sometimes used by the daughters of Emperor Nicholas II of Russia and his consort, Alexandra Feodorovna, as a group nickname for themselves, built from the first letter of each girl's name in the order of their births: Olga, Tatiana, Maria, and Anastasia.

==== Swahili ====
In Swahili, acronyms are common for naming organizations such as TUKI, which stands for Taasisi ya Uchunguzi wa Kiswahili ('Institute for Swahili Research'). Multiple initial letters (often the initial syllable of words) are often drawn together, as seen more in some languages than others.

==== Vietnamese ====
In Vietnamese, which has an abundance of compound words, initialisms are very commonly used for both proper and common nouns. Examples include TP.HCM (Thành phố Hồ Chí Minh, 'Ho Chi Minh City'), THPT (trung học phổ thông, 'high school'), CLB (câu lạc bộ, 'club'), CSDL (cơ sở dữ liệu, 'database'), NXB (nhà xuất bản, 'publisher'), ÔBACE (ông bà anh chị em, a general form of address), and CTTĐVN (các Thánh tử đạo Việt Nam, 'Vietnamese Martyrs'). Longer examples include CHXHCNVN (Cộng hòa Xã hội chủ nghĩa Việt Nam, 'Socialist Republic of Vietnam') and MTDTGPMNVN (Mặt trận Dân tộc Giải phóng miền Nam Việt Nam, 'Liberation Army of South Vietnam or the National Liberation Front of South Vietnam'). Long initialisms have become widespread in legal contexts in Vietnam, for example TTLT-VKSNDTC-TANDTC. It is also common for a writer to coin an ad hoc initialism for repeated use in an article.

Each letter in an initialism corresponds to one morpheme, that is, one syllable. When the first letter of a syllable has a tone mark or other diacritic, the diacritic may be omitted from the initialism, for example ĐNA or ĐNÁ for Đông Nam Á ('Southeast Asia') and LMCA or LMCÂ for Liên minh châu Âu ('European Union'). The letter Ư is often replaced by W in initialisms to avoid confusion with U, for example UBTWMTTQVN or UBTƯMTTQVN for Ủy ban Trung ương Mặt trận Tổ quốc Việt Nam ('Central Committee of the Vietnamese Fatherland Front').

Initialisms are purely a written convenience, being pronounced the same way as their expansions. As the names of many Vietnamese letters are disyllabic, it would be less convenient to pronounce an initialism by its individual letters. Acronyms pronounced as words are rare in Vietnamese, occurring when an acronym itself is borrowed from another language. Examples include SIĐA (pronounced [s̪i˧ ˀɗaː˧]), a respelling of the French acronym SIDA ('AIDS'); VOA (pronounced [vwaː˧]), a literal reading of the English initialism for 'Voice of America'; and NASA (pronounced [naː˧ zaː˧]), borrowed directly from the English acronym.

As in Chinese, many compound words can be shortened to the first syllable when forming a longer word. For example, the term Việt Cộng is derived from the first syllables of Việt Nam ('Vietnam') and Cộng sản ('communist'). This mechanism is limited to Sino-Vietnamese vocabulary. Unlike with Chinese, such clipped compounds are considered to be portmanteau words or blend words rather than acronyms or initialisms, because the Vietnamese alphabet still requires each component word to be written as more than one character.

=== General grammatical considerations ===
==== Declension ====
In languages where nouns are declined, various methods are used. An example is Finnish, where a colon is used to separate inflection from the letters:

- An acronym is pronounced as a word: NATO or Nato [ˈnɑto] – Natoon [ˈnɑtoːn] 'into Nato'; another example is Nasalta 'from NASA'
- An acronym is pronounced as letters: EU [ˈeːˌʔuː] – EU:hun [ˈeːˌʔuːhun] 'into [the] EU'
- An acronym is interpreted as words: EU [euroːpan unioni] – EU:iin [ˈeu̯roːpɑnˌunioniːn] 'into [the] EU'

The process above is similar to the way that hyphens are used for clarity in English when prefixes are added to acronyms: thus pre-NATO policy (rather than preNATO).

==== Lenition ====
In languages such as Scottish Gaelic and Irish, where lenition (initial consonant mutation) is commonplace, acronyms must also be modified in situations where case and context dictate it. In the case of Scottish Gaelic, a lower-case h is often added after the initial consonant; for example, 'BBC Scotland' in the genitive case would be written as BhBC Alba, with the acronym pronounced VBC. Likewise, the Gaelic acronym for telebhisean 'television' is TBh, pronounced TV, as in English.

== See also ==
- Acrostic – Text formed from parts of another text
- Amalgamation (names) – Name formed by combining several previously existing names
- Initialized sign – Handshape sign for finger spelling in the sign language
- One-letter word – Word composed of a single letter
- Syllabic abbreviation – Shortened form of a word or phrase
