= Yopi =

Yopi may refer to:

- Yopi (Zapotec god), a Zapotec divinity, generally identified with Xipe Totec of the Aztecs
- Tlapanec people, known to the Aztecs as Yopi
- Tlapanec language

== See also ==
- Yopy, a brand of personal digital assistants
