= IHO (disambiguation) =

As a three letter acronym, IHO can be:

- International Hydrographic Organization
- the former IOC 3-letter country code for Netherlands Indies
