= DRS =

DRS may refer to:

== Organisations ==
- Direct Rail Services, a British freight operating company
- Schweizer Radio DRS, the German language service of Swiss broadcaster SRG SSR
- SF DRS, former name of Schweizer Fernsehen (Swiss Television)
- Design Research Society, an international society
- Département du Renseignement et de la Sécurité, the Algerian state intelligence service
- Drought Relief Service, a defunct US government agency that purchased cattle in counties affected by the Dust Bowl
- DRS Technologies, former name of the US-based defense contractor Leonardo DRS
- Davis Renov Stahler Yeshiva High School for Boys, in Woodmere, New York, US

== Music ==
- DRS (band), an American R&B band
- DRS, real name Darren Scott, member of the Scottish rapper and songwriter duo SHY & DRS
- MC D.R.S., British rapper

== Sport ==
- Dead Runners Society, a worldwide online running club
- Decision Review System, in cricket
- Defensive Runs Saved, a baseball statistic
- Drag reduction system, an adjustable bodywork component in motorsport

== Technology ==
- ICL DRS, a defunct range of computers
- Dynamic resolution scaling, in real-time rendering
- Distributed resource scheduler, in VMware Infrastructure
- Diffuse reflectance spectroscopy

== Finance ==
- Direct Registration System, DRS, see Direct holding system, provides investors with an alternative to holding their securities

== Other uses ==
- Drs, the plural contraction of Doctor
- drs., abbreviation for the Dutch academic title doctorandus, the equivalent of MSc
- Discourse representation structure, used in linguistics to represent sentences
- Dresden Airport (IATA code), Germany
- Deposit-refund system, a surcharge on a product when purchased and a rebate when it is returned
- Dandot railway station (station code), Punjab, Pakistan
- Dundonald railway station, Dundonald, County Down, Northern Ireland
