= RSVP =

Process by which people are asked to respond to an invitation

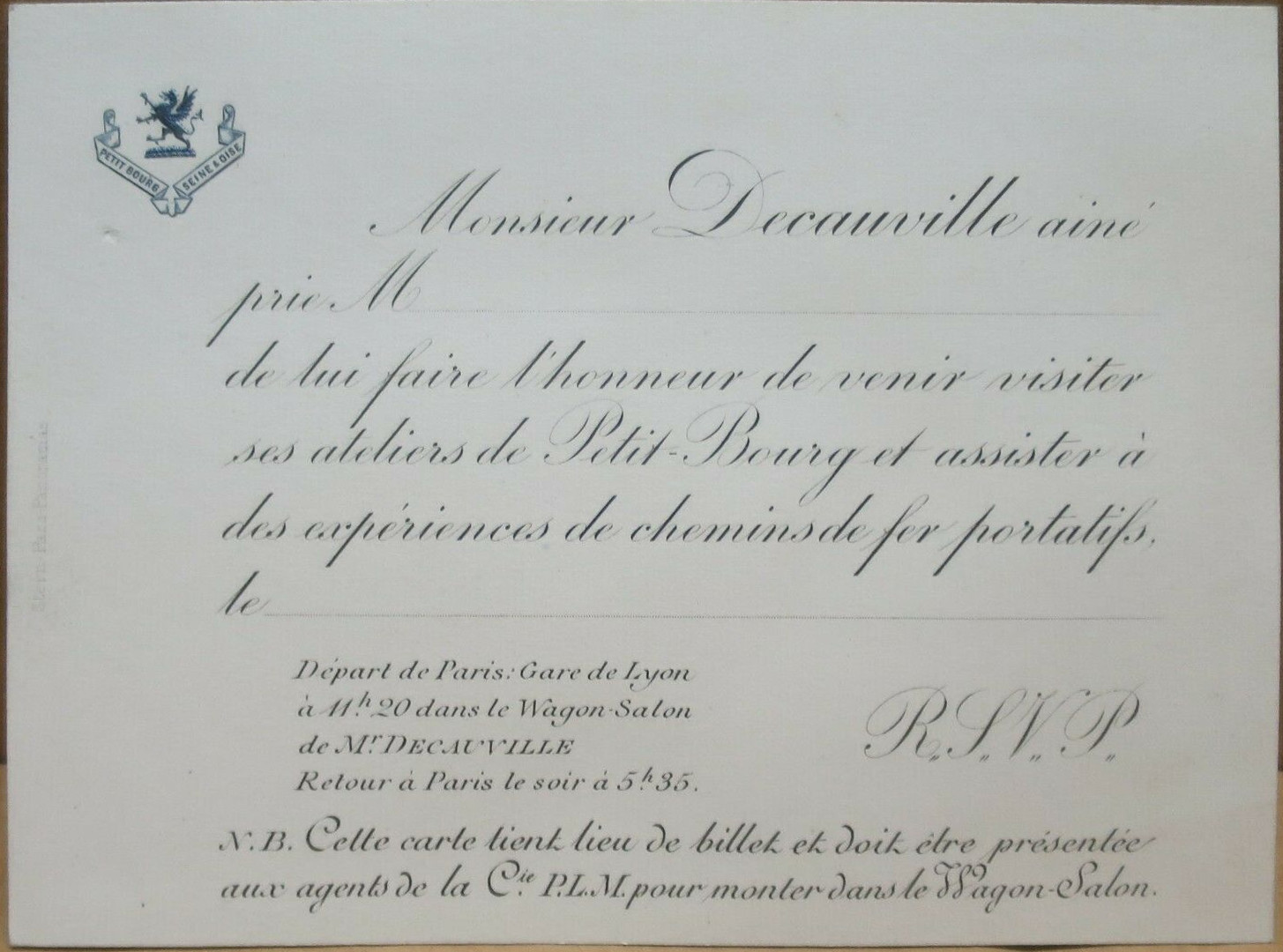
Parisien invite ending in "RSVP", from c. 1900

RSVP is an initialism derived from the French phrase "répondez s'il vous plaît", meaning "please respond" (literally "respond if it pleases you"). It is typically used to request confirmation of an invitation. Occasionally, the phrase "please RSVP" is used, which is a case of RAS syndrome (a pleonasm), as "s'il vous plaît" means "please".

While commonly used in English, "RSVP" is no longer widely used in France, where it is considered formal and old-fashioned; it is more common to use "Réponse attendue avant le …", meaning "[Your] answer is expected before …". In addition, the French initialism "SVP" is frequently used to represent "S'il vous plaît" ("please").

== Variations ==
The phrase "RSVP, regrets only" (or simply "Regrets only") is a modern variation that implies that not receiving an answer will be taken as an acceptance. It is used in cases where most invitations are assumed to be accepted and is meant to reduce the amount of communication required. The phrase "regrets only" refers to the assumption that a declination will be worded with some variation of "We regret that we cannot attend …".

Before sending an RSVP, the host may mail out a save the date card to inform guests of the date and location of the celebration. This may be used when the event will be held considerably in the future or in a distant location and serves to allow for travel plans.

== Digital RSVPs ==
Digital RSVPs have become common, particularly for wedding invitations.

== See also ==
- iCalendar
