= P.I.P.S. =

Symbian software libraries

- Stable release: 1.7 / 10 April 2010; 16 years ago
- Written in: C, C++
- Operating system: Symbian OS
- Type: Application programming interface

P.I.P.S. is a set of software libraries on Symbian OS intended to help C language programmers in the migration of desktop and server middleware, applications to Symbian-based mobile smartphone devices.

== Software libraries ==
The PIPS software libraries provides C and C++ application programming interfaces in standard C libraries such as

- POSIX
  - libc – The "C Standard Library" with system APIs mapped to Symbian OS APIs for better performance
  - libm – A mathematical library
  - libpthread – Implements POSIX-style threading support in terms of the underlying Symbian OS thread support
  - libdl – Implements POSIX-style dynamic linking which extends the dynamic loading model of Symbian OS
- LIBZ
  - libz
- OpenSSL
  - libcrypt
  - libcrypto
  - libssl
- GNOME
  - libglib

== Limitations ==
The P.I.P.S. environment does not support true signalling. Basic signal support is emulated using threads.

== Extensions and successors: Open C and Open C++ ==
Open C and Open C++ are extensions by Nokia of P.I.P.S. In contrast to mere P.I.P.S., they were only for Series 60 phones.

== Naming ==
P.I.P.S. is a recursive acronym for "P.I.P.S. is POSIX on Symbian OS". The name was the result of an internal competition in the Symbian Developer Marketing department, organised by Bruce Carney (Developer Marketing) and Erik Jacobson (Product Manager). The full stops were inserted by Symbian's Legal department to ensure there were no trademark or copyright infringements.

== See also ==
- POSIX
- POSIX Threads
- C POSIX library
