= Recursive acronym =

Acronym whose expansion includes a copy of itself

A recursive acronym is an acronym that refers to itself, and appears most frequently in computer programming. The term was first used in print in 1979 in Douglas Hofstadter's book Gödel, Escher, Bach: An Eternal Golden Braid, in which Hofstadter invents the acronym GOD, meaning "GOD Over Djinn", to help explain infinite series, and describes it as a recursive acronym. Other references followed, however the concept was used as early as 1968 in John Brunner's science fiction novel Stand on Zanzibar. In the story, the acronym EPT (Education for a Particular Task) later morphed into "Eptification for Particular Task".

Recursive acronyms typically form backwardly: either an existing ordinary acronym is given a new explanation of what the letters stand for, or a name is turned into an acronym by giving the letters an explanation of what they stand for, in each case with the first letter standing recursively for the whole acronym.

== Use in computing ==
In computing, an early tradition in the hacker community, especially at MIT, was to choose acronyms and abbreviations that referred humorously to themselves or to other abbreviations. Perhaps the earliest example in this context is the backronym "Mash Until No Good", which was created in 1960 to describe Mung, and revised to "Mung Until No Good". It lived on as a recursive command in the editing language TECO. In 1977 programmer Ted Anderson coined TINT ("TINT Is Not TECO"), an editor for MagicSix. This inspired the two MIT Lisp Machine editors called EINE ("EINE Is Not Emacs", German for one) and ZWEI ("ZWEI Was EINE Initially", German for two), in turn inspiring Anderson's retort SINE ("SINE is not EINE"). Richard Stallman followed with GNU (GNU's Not Unix).

Recursive acronym examples often include negatives, such as denials that the thing defined is or resembles something else (which the thing defined does in fact resemble or is even derived from), to indicate that, despite the similarities, it was distinct from the program on which it was based.

An earlier example appears in a 1976 textbook on data structures, in which the pseudo-language SPARKS is used to define the algorithms discussed in the text. "SPARKS" is claimed to be a non-acronymic name, but "several cute ideas have been suggested" as expansions of the name. One of the suggestions is "Smart Programmers Are Required to Know SPARKS".

Other examples are the YAML language, which stands for "YAML ain't markup language" and PHP language meaning "PHP: Hypertext Preprocessor".

=== Examples ===
- Allegro: Allegro Low LEvel Game ROutines (early versions for Atari ST were called "Atari Low Level Game Routines")
- AROS: AROS Research Operating System (originally Amiga Research Operating System)
- ATI: ATI Technologies Inc.
- BIRD: BIRD Internet Routing Daemon
- CAVE: CAVE Automatic Virtual Environment
- Darcs: Darcs Advanced Revision Control System
- EINE: EINE Is Not Emacs
- FIJI: FIJI Is Just ImageJ
- GiNaC: GiNaC is Not a CAS (Computer Algebra System)
- GNE (encyclopedia): GNE's Not an Encyclopedia
- GNU: GNU's Not Unix
- GPE: GPE Palmtop Environment
- gRPC: grpc Remote Procedure Calls
- Hurd: "Hurd" stands for "Hird of Unix-Replacing Daemons", "Hird" stands for "Hurd of Interfaces Representing Depth."
- JACK: JACK Audio Connection Kit
- JOE: Joe's Own Editor
- KGS: KGS Go Server
- LAME: LAME Ain't MP3 Encoder
- LiVES: LiVES is Video Editing System
- MATE: MATE Advanced Traditional Environment
- MINDY: MINDY Is Not Dylan Yet
- MINC: MINC Is Not C
- MiNT: MiNT is Not TOS (later changed to "MiNT is Now TOS")
- MINT: MINT Is Not TRAC
- Mung: Mung Until No Good
- Nagios: Nagios Ain't Gonna Insist On Sainthood (a reference to the previous name of Nagios, "Netsaint"; agios [αγιος] is the Greek word for "saint")
- NiL: NiL Isn't Liero
- PHP: PHP: Hypertext Preprocessor (from "Personal Home Page Tools", more frequently referenced as "PHP Tools.")
- PINE: PINE Is Nearly Elm, originally; PINE now officially stands for "Pine Internet News E-mail"
- PINT: PINT Is Not TEMPO3
- PIP: PIP Installs Packages
- P.I.P.S.: P.I.P.S. Is POSIX Symbian
- PNG: officially "Portable Network Graphics", but unofficially "PNG's not GIF".
- RPM: RPM Package Manager
- SPARQL: SPARQL Protocol And RDF Query Language
- TikZ: TikZ ist kein Zeichnenprogramm (German; TikZ is not a drawing program)
- TiLP: TiLP is Linking Program
- TIP: TIP isn't Pico
- TRESOR: TRESOR Runs Encryption Securely Outside RAM
- UIRA: UIRA Isn't Recursive Acronym
- WINE: WINE Is Not an Emulator
- XAMPP: XAMPP Apache MariaDB PHP Perl
- XBMC: XBMC Media Center (originally Xbox Media Center)
- XINU: XINU Is Not Unix
- XNA: XNA's Not Acronymed
- YAML: YAML Ain't Markup Language (initially "Yet Another Markup Language")
- YARA: Yara: Another Recursive Acronym
- ZWEI: ZWEI Was EINE Initially ("eine" and "zwei" are German for "one" and "two" respectively)

== Other examples ==
=== Companies and organizations ===
- BWIA: BWIA West Indies Airways (formerly British West Indian Airways)
- CYGNUS Solutions: "Cygnus, Your GNU Solutions"
- HIM: HIM International Music, Taiwanese independent record label
- MEGA: MEGA Encrypted Global Access
- MOM: MOM's Organic Market
- TAP: TAP Air Portugal
- VISA: Visa International Service Association
- ZINC: ZINC Is Not Commercial
- OIL: Oil India Limited. However it can be debatable as "Oil" is a noun and the company is in the oil industry.
- Die PARTEI: Die Partei für Arbeit, Rechtsstaat, Tierschutz, Elitenförderung und basisdemokratische Initiative (Literally, "Party for Labour, Rule of Law, Animal Protection, Promotion of Elites and Grassroots Democratic Initiative"), a German satirical political party. Note that the German Article "Die" (literally "The") does not count into the recursive acronym itself.
- HQS: HQS Quantum Simulations

=== In media ===
- TTP: a technology project in the Dilbert comic strip. The initials stand for "The TTP Project".
- GRUNGE: defined by Homer Simpson in The Simpsons episode That '90s Show as "Guitar Rock Utilizing Nihilist Grunge Energy", another uncommon example of a recursive acronym whose recursive letter is neither the first nor the last letter.
- BOB: the primary antagonist from the series Twin Peaks. His name itself is an acronym standing for "Beware of BOB".
- KOS-MOS: a character from the Xenosaga series of video games. "KOS-MOS" is a recursive acronym meaning "Kosmos Obey Strategical Multiple Operation System".
- Hiroshi Yoshimura's "A・I・R" stands for "AIR IN RESORT".
- BFB: The fourth season of Battle For Dream Island was initially called "Battle for B.F.D.I." but was changed later to "Battle for B.F.B."
- FIJI: One of the found poems from Dave Gorman: Modern Life Is Goodish features Fiji's name being acronymised as "Fiji Is Just Idiotic".

=== Brands and products ===
- MIATA: MIATA is Always the Answer
- Jini claims the distinction of being the first recursive anti-acronym: 'Jini Is Not Initials'. It might, however, be more properly termed an anti-backronym because the term "Jini" never stood for anything in the first place. The more recent "XNA", on the other hand, was deliberately designed that way.

=== Special ===
- RPM, PHP, XBMC and YAML were originally conventional acronyms which were later redefined recursively. They are examples of backronyms, where the official meaning of an acronym is changed.
- Most recursive acronyms are recursive on the first letter, which is therefore an arbitrary choice, often selected for reasons of humour, ease of pronunciation, or consistency with an earlier acronym that used the same letters for different words, such as PHP, which now stands for "PHP: Hypertext Preprocessor", but was originally "Personal Home Page". However YOPY, "Your own personal YOPY" is recursive on the last letter.
- A joke implying that the middle initial "B." in the name of Benoit B. Mandelbrot stands for "Benoit B. Mandelbrot" plays on the idea that fractals, which Mandelbrot studied, repeat themselves at smaller and smaller scales when examined closely.

=== Other ===
- According to Hayyim Vital, a 16th–17th century kabbalist, the Hebrew word adam (אדם, meaning "man") is an acronym for adam, dibbur, maaseh (man, speech, deed).
- According to Isaac Luria, a 16th-century kabbalist, the Hebrew word tzitzit (ציצת in its Biblical spelling, meaning "ritual fringes") is an acronym for tzaddik yafrid tzitziyotav tamid ("a righteous person should separate [the strings of] his tzitzit constantly").

== See also ==
- Bilingual tautological expressions – Redundancy in linguistic expression
- RAS syndrome – Redundant use of acronyms (Redundant Acronym Syndrome syndrome)
- Self-reference – Sentence, idea or formula that refers to itself
- TLA, the three-letter acronym for three-letter acronyms
- Web Ontology Language – Family of knowledge representation languages, which intentionally uses the acronym "OWL"
