= Tempo (astronomy) =

Computer program for pulsars

Tempo is a computer program to analyze radio observations of pulsars. Once enough observations are available, Tempo can deduce the pulsar rotation rate and phase, astrometric position and rates of change, and parameters of binary systems, by fitting models to pulse times of arrival measured at one or more terrestrial observatories. This is a non-trivial procedure because much larger effects must be removed before the detailed fit can be performed. These include:

- Dispersion of the pulses in the Interstellar medium, the Solar System, and the ionosphere
- Observatory motion (including Earth rotation, precession, nutation, polar motion and orbital motion)
- Tropospheric propagation delay
- Gravitational time dilation due to binary companions and Solar System bodies.

Tempo is maintained and distributed on SourceForge. There is a reference manual available, but no general documentation.

Tempo is a relatively old program, and is being replaced by Tempo2. The main advantages of Tempo2, from the abstract, are:

We have developed tempo2, a new pulsar timing package that contains propagation and other relevant effects implemented at the 1ns level of precision (a factor of ~100 more precise than previously obtainable). In contrast with earlier timing packages, tempo2 is compliant with the general relativistic framework of the IAU 1991 and 2000 resolutions and hence uses the International Celestial Reference System, Barycentric Coordinate Time and up-to-date precession, nutation and polar motion models.

== See also ==
- Pulsar
- Binary pulsar
- Recursive acronym
