= RAS syndrome =

Redundant use of acronyms

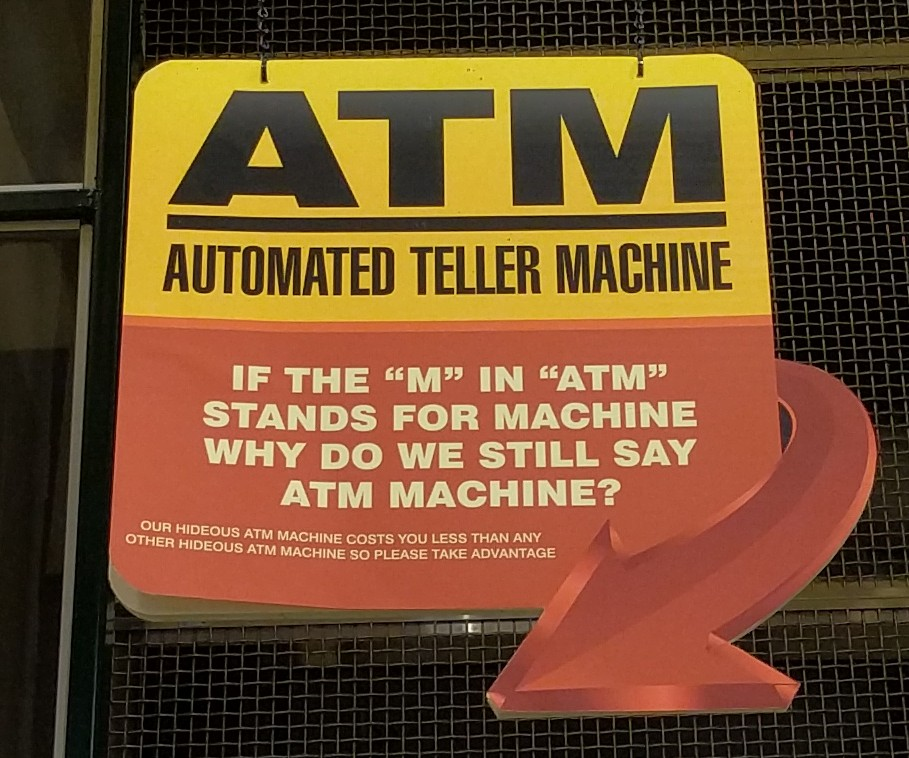
"ATM machine" is a common example of RAS syndrome

RAS syndrome is the redundant use of one or more of the words that make up an acronym in conjunction with the abbreviated form. This means, in effect, repeating one or more words from the acronym. For example: PIN number (expanding to "personal identification number number") and ATM machine (expanding to "automated teller machine machine"). RAS stands for "redundant acronym syndrome", making the phrase RAS syndrome autological. The term was coined in 2001 in a light-hearted column in New Scientist.

A person is said to "suffer" from RAS syndrome when they redundantly use one or more of the words that make up an acronym or initialism with the abbreviation itself. Usage commentators consider such redundant acronyms poor style that is best avoided in writing, especially in a formal context, though they are common in speech. The degree to which there is a need to avoid pleonasms such as redundant acronyms depends on one's balance point of prescriptivism (ideas about how language should be used) versus descriptivism (the realities of how natural language is used). For writing intended to persuade, impress, or avoid criticism, many usage guides advise writers to avoid pleonasm as much as possible, not because such usage is always wrong, but rather because most of one's audience may believe that it is always wrong.

== Linguistics ==
Although there are many instances in editing where removal of redundancy improves clarity, the pure-logic ideal of zero redundancy is seldom maintained in human languages. Bill Bryson says: "Not all repetition is bad. It can be used for effect ..., or for clarity, or in deference to idiom. 'OPEC countries', 'SALT talks' and 'HIV virus' are all technically redundant because the second word is already contained in the preceding abbreviation, but only the ultra-finicky would deplore them. Similarly, in 'Wipe that smile off your face' the last two words are tautological—there is no other place a smile could be—but the sentence would not stand without them."

A limited amount of redundancy can improve the effectiveness of communication, either for the whole readership or at least to offer help to those readers who need it. A phonetic example of that principle is the need for spelling alphabets in radiotelephony. Some instances of RAS syndrome can be viewed as syntactic examples of the principle. The redundancy may help the listener by providing context and decreasing the "alphabet soup quotient" (the cryptic overabundance of abbreviations and acronyms) of the communication.

Acronyms from foreign languages are often treated as unanalyzed morphemes when they are not translated. For example, in French, "le protocole IP" (the Internet Protocol protocol) is often used, and in English "please RSVP" (roughly "please respond please") is very common. This occurs for the same linguistic reasons that cause many toponyms to be tautological. The tautology is not parsed by the mind in most instances of real-world use (in many cases because the foreign word's meaning is not known anyway, and in others simply because the usage is idiomatic).

== Examples ==
Examples of RAS phrases include:

- DC Comics ("Detective Comics Comics")
- HIV virus ("Human immunodeficiency virus virus")
- LCD display ("Liquid-crystal display display")
- UPC code ("Universal Product Code code")

== See also ==
- Pleonasm § Bilingual tautological expressions
- Recursive acronym
