= Three-letter acronym =

Abbreviation consisting of three letters

A three-letter acronym (TLA), or three-letter abbreviation is an abbreviation consisting of three letters. The term has a special status among abbreviations and to some is considered humorous since the term TLA is itself a three-letter acronym; it is an autological word.

Most TLAs are initialisms (the initial letter of each word of a phrase), but most are not acronyms in the strict sense since they are pronounced by saying each letter, as in APA /ˌeɪpiːˈeɪ/ AY-pee-AY. Some are true acronyms (pronounced as a word) such as CAT (as in CAT scan) which is pronounced as the animal.

== Examples ==
- Academic testing: ACT, SAT
- Air Navigation Services (ANS): AIS, ATC, ATM, ATS, CNS, FIS, MET, and SAR
- IATA airport codes: LAX and LHR
- Business: CEO, CFO, and other C-level officers
- Canine registries: AKC and CKC
- Chemistry, biology, and pharmaceuticals: GMO, LSD, and MSG
- Clinical medicine: CAD, CHF, PSA, and SOB
- Communications shorthand: LOL and OMG
- Computing: CPU, DOS, RAM, ROM, and GNU
- Corporations: BMW, IBM, AMD, KFC and NEC
- Countries: USA, CAR, UAE, DRC, etc.
- Currency: USD, GBP, RMB, and CHF
- Famous people: SRK, FDR, JFK, MJK, MLK, OBL, RBG, RDJ, RFK, and RMS
- File extensions: JPG, PDF, and XLS
- Military and weaponry: BFR and RPG
- Musical groups: R.E.M., XTC, TLC, E.L.O., MC5, GBH, O.A.R., MDC, D.R.I., JFA
- Personal advertisements: SBM for single black male, STR for short-term relationship
- Political parties: BJP, CCP, GOP, and AAP
- Religion: LDS, SBC, and SDA
- Ship prefixes: HMS, USS, and RMS
- Sports organizations: NFL, MLB, (North America); AFL, and NRL (Australia); NPB (Japan); ACB, LFP (Spain); IPL (India), EPL (England), WBO
- State postal abbreviations: NSW, QLD, VIC, and TAS (Australia)
- Television networks: ABC (Australia, U.S.), BBC (UK), CBC (Canada, Japan), and NHK (Japan)
- Three-letter agencies: CIA, FBI, CBI, FSB, and NSA
- Traffic offenses: DUI, DWI, GTA
- Universities: LSU, NYU, USC
- Wars and political conflicts: HYW and WWI

== History and origins ==
The exact phrase three-letter acronym appeared in the sociology literature in 1975. Three-letter acronyms were used as mnemonics in biological sciences, from 1977 and their practical advantage was promoted by Weber in 1982. They are used in many other fields, but the term TLA is particularly associated with computing. In 1980, the manual for the Sinclair ZX81 home computer used and explained TLA. The specific generation of three-letter acronyms in computing was mentioned in a JPL report of 1982. In 1988, in a paper titled "On the Cruelty of Really Teaching Computing Science", eminent computer scientist Edsger W. Dijkstra wrote (disparagingly): "No endeavour is respectable these days without a TLA." By 1992 it was in a Microsoft handbook.

== Combinatorics ==
The number of possible three-letter abbreviations using the 26 letters of the alphabet from A to Z (AAA, AAB, ... to ZZY, ZZZ) is 26 × 26 × 26 = 17,576. Allowing a single digit 0–9 increases this by 26 × 26 × 10 = 6,760 for each position, such as 2FA, P2P, or WW2, giving a total of 37,856 such three-character strings (= 17,576 + 3 × 6,760).

Out of the 17,576 possible TLAs that can be created using 3 uppercase letters, at least 94% of them had been used at least once in a dataset of 18 million scientific article abstracts. Three-letter acronyms are the most common type of acronym in scientific research papers, with acronyms of length 3 being twice as common as those of length 2 or 4.

In standard English, WWW is the TLA whose pronunciation requires the most syllables—typically nine. The usefulness of a TLA typically comes from its being quicker to say than the phrase it represents; however saying "WWW" in English requires three times as many syllables as the phrase it is meant to abbreviate (World Wide Web). "WWW" is sometimes abbreviated to "dubdubdub" in speech.

== See also ==
- Acronym
- Alphabet agencies
- ISO 4217 (currency code)
- List of abbreviations in photography
- List of computing and IT abbreviations
- List of three-letter broadcast call signs in the United States
- List of three-letter combinations having Wikipedia articles
- List of three-letter acronym disambiguation pages on Wikipedia
- Lists of acronyms
- Lists of airports by IATA and ICAO code
- Q code
- Recursive acronym
  - RAS syndrome
- Country code § Lists of country codes by country
