= Alphabet soup (linguistics) =

Metaphor for excessive initialisms or acronyms

Alphabet soup is a metaphor for an abundance of abbreviations or acronyms, named for a common dish made from alphabet pasta. Its use dates at least as far back as Franklin D. Roosevelt's alphabet agencies of the New Deal. In the United States, the federal government is described as an alphabet soup on account of the multitude of agencies that it has spawned, including the NSA, CIA, FBI, USSS, ATF, DEA, EPA, NCIS, IRS and INS. In 1938, a US barbershop harmony organization was founded, aptly named SPEBSQSA or the Society for the Preservation and Encouragement of Barber Shop Quartet Singing in America, as a humorous lampoon to these numerous "alphabet soup" agencies.

The alphabet soup metaphor has been used to describe issues in comprehension that have major effects on scholarship, including confusion between different theories. One such example of alphabet soup affecting scholarship is in statistical testing, in which distinction between p and α are not always made clear because of the "alphabet soup" of letters referring to statistical evidence and errors. The many distinctions between types of pneumonia have also been described as an alphabet soup, requiring a scholarly article detailing the differences between the many acronyms.

Alphabet soup has also been used to describe longer initialisms based on LGBT such as LGBTQQIAAP. Alphabet soup is also used to describe historical language scripts that appear as long sequences of symbols that do not have clear demarcations of words.
