= Mung (computer term) =

Irrevocable changes to a piece of data

In computer programming, mung or munge is jargon for a series of potentially destructive or irrevocable changes to a piece of data or a file. It is sometimes used for vague data transformation steps that are not yet clear to the speaker. Common munging operations include removing punctuation or HTML tags, data parsing, filtering, and transformation.

The term was coined in 1958 in the Tech Model Railroad Club at the Massachusetts Institute of Technology. In 1960 the backronym "Mash Until No Good" was created to describe Mung, and by 1976 it was revised to "Mung Until No Good", making it one of the first recursive acronyms. It lived on as a recursive command in the editing language TECO.

Munging may also describe the constructive operation of tying together systems and interfaces that were not specifically designed to interoperate (also called 'duct-taping'). Munging can also describe the processing or filtering of raw data into another form.

As the "no good" part of the acronym implies, munging often involves irrevocable destruction of data.

== See also ==
- Jargon File – a glossary of hacker slang.
- Slug – an application of munging for creating human-friendly URLs.
- Kludge – a neologism developed near this time with a similar meaning
- Munged password (referring to a slightly different process)
- Data wrangling
