= Yopy =

The Yopy was the name of a series of Personal Digital Assistants (PDA) made by GMate Corporation, also used as a popular PDA Phone in Korea and based on the Linux operating system. The Linux Documentation Project considers the Yopy series to be "true Linux PDAs" because their manufacturers install Linux-based operating systems on them by default.

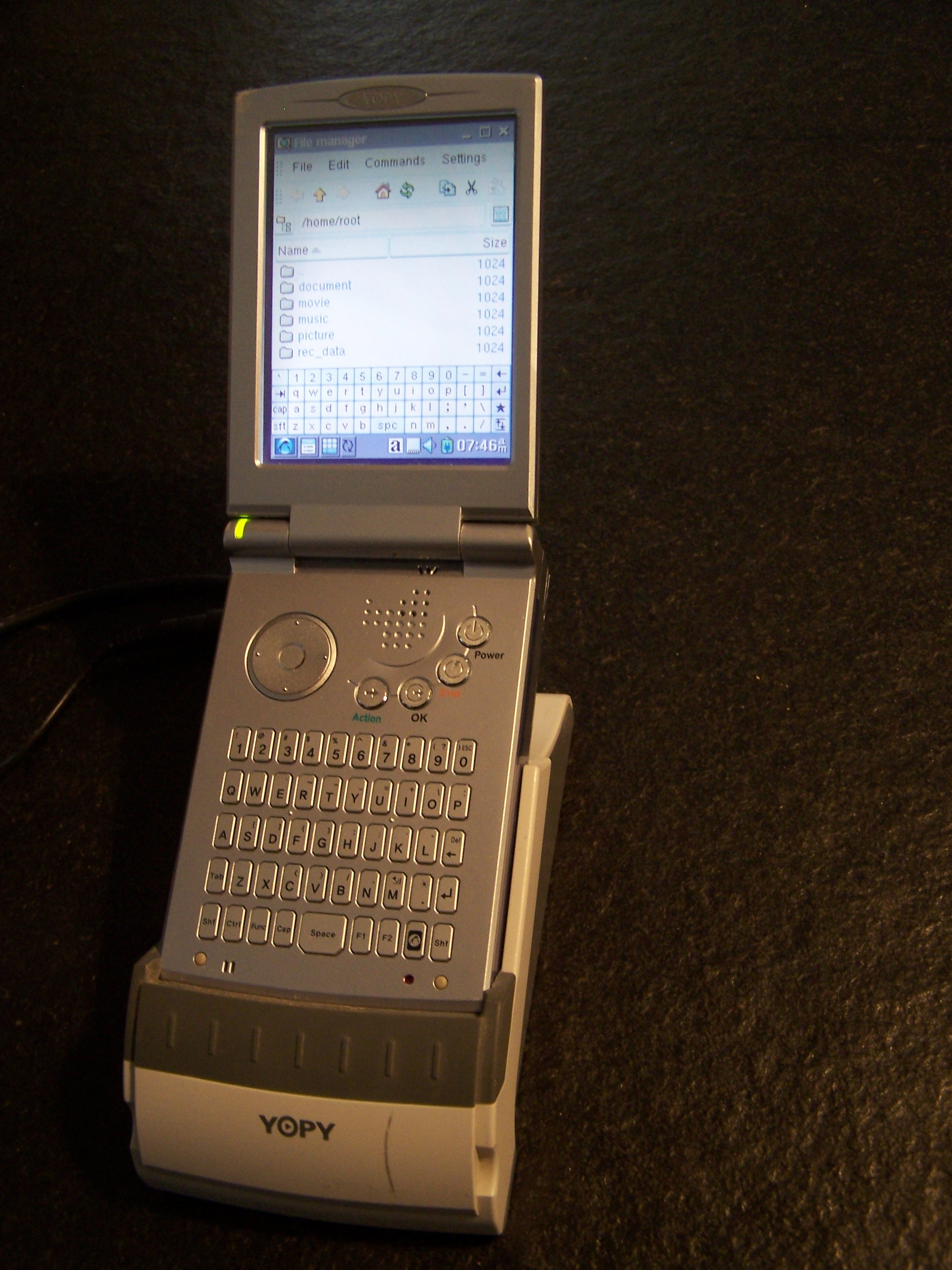
Yopy in its cradle

== Overview ==
At the CeBIT 2000, GMate introduced the YDK1000, the Yopy Development Kit. Without a physical keyboard this device looked very different from later versions. It came with an embedded Linux operating system and the W Window System. Later also precompiled versions of the X Window System and the IceWM window manager became available.

The first official model in the Yopy line of PDAs was the YP3000. It introduced the clam shell design with a full-Qwerty keyboard, and featured a 3.5 inch TFT screen. It also came with the X Window System and IceWM.

One of the features of the YP3500 is a CDMA module, so it can be used as a mobile phone. In 2003, Wi-Fi was widely used in Korea, and so the YP3700 targeted this environment with an additional Wi-Fi module.

By March 2005 Gmate had stopped producing and selling the Yopy PDA and closed down its official web sites.

== Yopy models ==
- YDK1000, the Yopy Development Kit
- YP3000, the first official model of the Yopy
- YP3500, CDMA module was added in YP3500
- YP3700, Wi-Fi module was added in YP3700

== Yopy software ==
Because it used the Linux operating system, the Yopy was capable of running a variety of open source software.

== Trivia ==
Yopy is a recursive acronym, standing for "Your own personal Yopy".
