= Alphabet agencies =

New Deal U.S. government agencies

- Date: 1933–1943 (Peak creation period)
- Location: United States
- Type: New Deal administrative expansion, executive reorganization
- Outcome: Establishment of dozens of emergency relief, recovery, and reform organizations; Creation of major enduring institutions including the SSA, FDIC, and SEC; Substantial, permanent expansion of the U.S. federal bureaucracy; Foundation of the modern welfare state in the United States

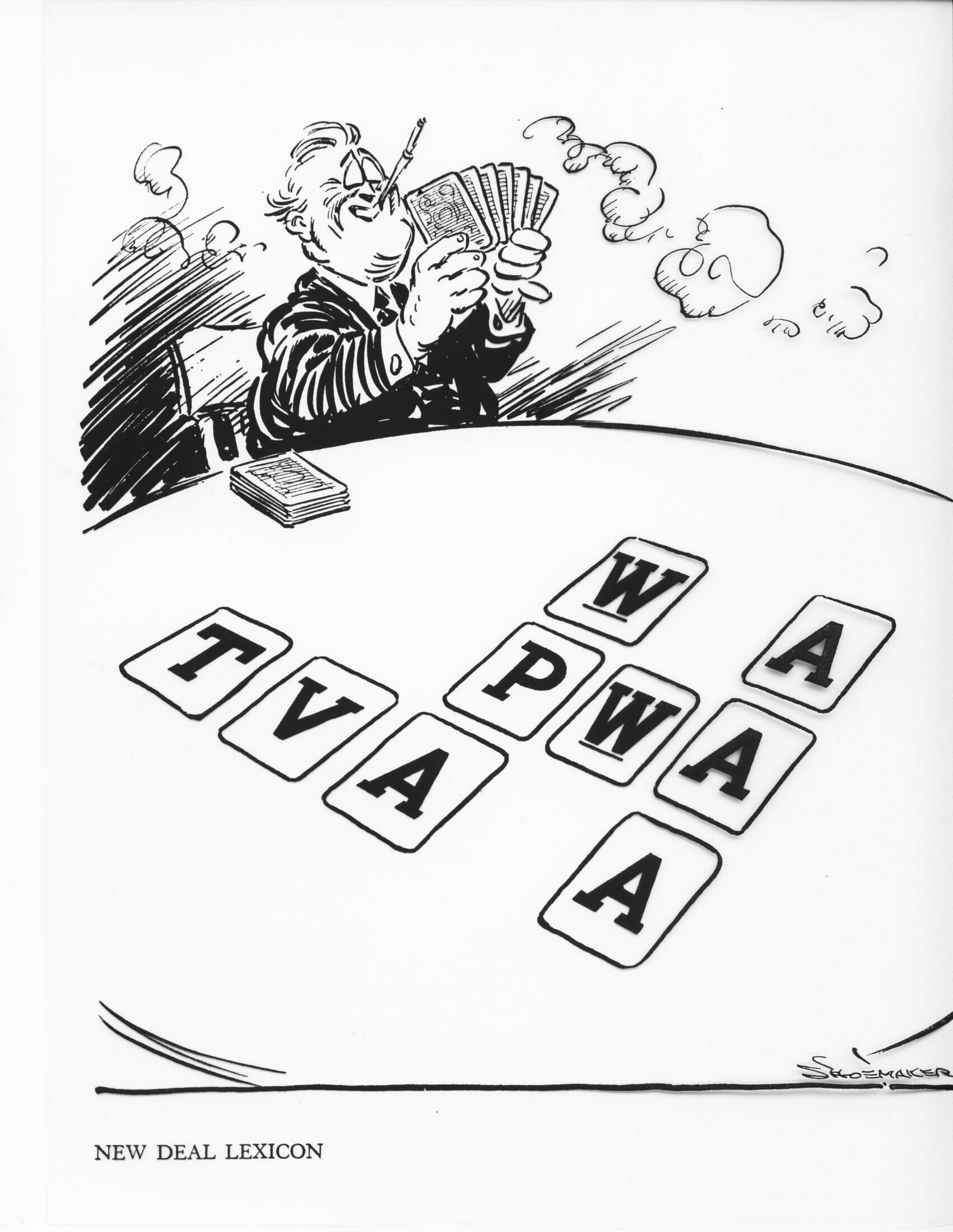
Editorial cartoons parodied the New Deal as Roosevelt's private game with alphabet agencies.

The alphabet agencies, or New Deal agencies, were the U.S. federal government agencies created as part of the New Deal of President Franklin D. Roosevelt. The earliest agencies were created to combat the Great Depression in the United States and were established during Roosevelt's first 100 days in office in 1933. In total, at least 69 offices were created during Roosevelt's terms of office as part of the New Deal. Some alphabet agencies were established by Congress, such as the Tennessee Valley Authority. Others were established through Roosevelt executive orders, such as the Works Progress Administration and the Office of Censorship, or were part of larger programs such as the many that belonged to the Works Progress Administration. Some of the agencies still exist today, while others have merged with other departments and agencies or were abolished.

The agencies were sometimes referred to as alphabet soup. Libertarian author William Safire notes that the phrase "gave color to the charge of excessive bureaucracy." Democrat Al Smith, who turned against Roosevelt, said his government was "submerged in a bowl of alphabet soup." "Even the Comptroller-General of the United States, who audits the government's accounts, declared he had never heard of some of them." While previously all monetary appropriations had been separately passed by Act of Congress, as part of their power of the purse; the National Industrial Recovery Act allowed Roosevelt to allocate $3.3 billion without Congress (as much as had been previously spent by government in ten years time), through executive orders and other means. These powers were used to create many of the alphabet agencies. Other laws were passed allowing the new bureaus to pass their own directives within a wide sphere of authority. Even though the National Industrial Recovery Act was found to be unconstitutional, many of the agencies created under it remained.

== Partial list of New Deal alphabet agencies ==
Initialism	Year	Agency	Remains in Effect
AAA	1933	Agricultural Adjustment Administration	No
BPA	1937	Bonneville Power Administration	Yes
CAA	1938	Civil Aeronautics Authority	Yes (now Federal Aviation Administration)
CCC	1933	Civilian Conservation Corps	No
CWA	1933	Civil Works Administration	No
DRS	1935	Drought Relief Service	No
DSH	1933	Subsistence Homesteads Division	No
EBA	1933	Emergency Banking Act	No
FAP	1935	Federal Art Project (part of WPA)	No
FCA	1933	Farm Credit Administration	Yes
FCC	1934	Federal Communications Commission	Yes
FDIC	1933	Federal Deposit Insurance Corporation	Yes
FERA	1933	Federal Emergency Relief Administration	No
FHA	1934	Federal Housing Administration	Yes (now subdivision of HUD)
FLSA	1938	Fair Labor Standards Act	Yes
FMP	1935	Federal Music Project (part of WPA)	No
FSA	1935	Farm Security Administration	No
FSRC	1933	Federal Surplus Relief Corporation	No
FTP	1935	Federal Theatre Project (part of WPA)	No
FWA	1939	Federal Works Agency	No
FWP	1935	Federal Writers' Project (part of WPA)	No
HOLC	1933	Home Owners' Loan Corporation	No
IRA	1934	Indian Reorganization Act	Yes
LUP	1934	Land Utilization Program	No
NIRA	1933	National Industrial Recovery Act	No
NLRA	1935	National Labor Relations Act	Yes
NLRB	1934	National Labor Relations Board/The Wagner Act	Yes
NRA	1933	National Recovery Administration	No
NYA	1935	National Youth Administration	No
PRRA	1933	Puerto Rico Reconstruction Administration	No
PWA	1933	Public Works Administration	No
RA	1935	Resettlement Administration	No
REA	1935	Rural Electrification Administration	Yes (now Rural Utilities Service)
SEC	1934	Securities and Exchange Commission	Yes
SES	1933	Soil Erosion Service	No
SSB (now SSA)	1935	Social Security Board	Yes (now Social Security Administration)
TVA	1933	Tennessee Valley Authority	Yes
USHA	1937	United States Housing Authority	No
USMC	1936	United States Maritime Commission	No
WPA	1935	Works Progress Administration	No

== In national security ==
Since the 1990s, the term "alphabet agencies" has been commonly used to describe the agencies of the U.S. national security state. Many are members of the United States Intelligence Community, and several were founded or expanded in the aftermath of the September 11 attacks. Alphabet agencies in this sense of the term may also be called three-letter agencies, because they often use three-letter acronyms.

Initialism	Year	Agency
ATF	1972	Bureau of Alcohol, Tobacco, Firearms and Explosives
CIA	1947	Central Intelligence Agency
DEA	1973	Drug Enforcement Administration
DIA	1961	Defense Intelligence Agency
DHS	2002	Department of Homeland Security
DOJ	1870	Department of Justice
FBI	1908	Federal Bureau of Investigation
FEMA	1979	Federal Emergency Management Agency
ICE	2003	Immigration and Customs Enforcement
NGA	2003	National Geospatial-Intelligence Agency
NRO	1961	National Reconnaissance Office
NSA	1953	National Security Agency
ONI	1882	Office of Naval Intelligence
OSI	1949	Office of Scientific Intelligence
TSA	2001	Transportation Security Administration

== Cabinet departments ==
Initialism	Year	Department
DOC	1913	Department of Commerce
DOD	1947	Department of Defense
DOE	1977	Department of Energy
DOI	1849	Department of the Interior
DOJ	1870	Department of Justice
DOL	1913	Department of Labor
DOS	1789	Department of State
HUD	1965	Department of Housing & Urban Development
ED	1979	Department of Education
DOT	1967	Department of Transportation
HHS	1953	Department of Health and Human Services
USDA	1862	Department of Agriculture
USDT	1789	Department of the Treasury
VA	1930	Department of Veterans Affairs
