= Antedating (lexicography) =

In lexicography, antedating is finding earlier citations of a particular term than those already known.

Historical dictionaries such as the Oxford English Dictionary provide citations meant to show the evolution of every word, beginning with the earliest known usage. Antedating is a key task in lexicography and a popular sport. By indicating limitations of dictionaries, antedating raises important questions of the consistency of editorial policies, and of the exhaustiveness and accuracy of dictionary material. The issue has thus been addressed in several major studies as well as in hundreds of papers tracing individual words, some of which are by-products of historical or linguistic research.

Similar activities are postdating (finding more recent evidence of words than is currently quoted) and interdating (intermediate evidence where large gaps in dating evidence exist).

To encourage and facilitate this process, dedicated submission forms are available on the internet and regular appeals to the public for investigation are being made. The appeal Wordhunt was part of the TV show Balderdash and Piffle on BBC.

== Literature ==
- Erin McKean: [What Came First: The Competitive Sport of Antedating], The Boston Globe, October 14, 2007
- David L. Gold: An Aspect Of Lexicography Still Not Fully Professionalized: The Search For Antedatings And Postdatings, Revista Alicantina de Estudios Ingleses 18 (2005): 25-69
