= Drought Relief Service =

The Drought Relief Service (DRS) was a federal agency of the U.S. New Deal formed in 1935 to coordinate relief activities in response to the Dust Bowl. It purchased cattle at risk of starvation due to drought.

== History ==
"Four extensive droughts developed in the Great Plains area between 1930 and 1940, causing widespread dust storms, agricultural failure, poverty, unemployment and devastation to the nation's economy." The drought in 1934 was described as "the worst ever in U.S. history, covering more than 75 percent of the country and affecting 27 states severely."

The DRS bought cattle in counties which were designated emergency areas, where cattle were in danger of starvation due to drought. The prices paid ranged from $14 to $20 a head. Animals unfit for human consumption – more than 50 percent at the beginning of the program – were killed. The remaining cattle were given to the Federal Surplus Relief Corporation (FSRC) to be used in food distribution to families nationwide.

A Texan describes the story passed down in his family:

In June of 1934, almost as a last resort, Congress authorized a Drought Relief Service for purchasing drought-stricken cattle. Depending on weight and condition, the agency would pay $4 to $8 for calves, $10 to $15 for yearlings, with cows, big steers and bulls bringing $12 to $20. Those in the worst condition were killed immediately and buried while others were sent to packing plants for slaughter.

Starting in June of 1934, the program ran until late January of 1935 with the government eventually purchasing almost 8.3 million head of livestock providing $111 million in payments to the livestock owners and their creditors...

I certainly remember the telling of the tales in later years about the livestock slaughter program. My parents and grandparents took their oldest milk cows and an older bull to the government buying station to be sold and slaughtered. I recall the carcasses were buried in a local caliche pit.

It is simply not true that some purchased livestock were driven over cliffs for slaughter, though tales still survive along that line.

On August 7, 1934 the following New York Times headline illustrated the extent of the program:

CATTLE SLAUGHTER A BLOW TO TANNERS; Price 'Catastrophe' Laid to Surplus of Hides Created in Federal Drought Program. RELIEF MEETINGS TODAY Groups in Chicago and Boston Seek to Stabilize Market as Quotations Drop Fast.

... Federal Surplus Relief Corporation agreed with the meat packers to pay them for their services by giving them all the byproducts ...

Although it was difficult for farmers to give up their herds, the cattle slaughter program helped many of them avoid bankruptcy. "The government cattle buying program was a God-send to many farmers, as they could not afford to keep their cattle, and the government paid a better price than they could obtain in local markets."
