= Interim Computer Museum =

Computer history museum in Tukwila, Washington

- Established: 2024
- Location: Tukwila, Washington, United States
- Coordinates: 47°26′56″N 122°14′50″W
- Type: Computer history museum
- Founder: Affiliated with SDF Public Access UNIX System
- Website: icm.museum

The Interim Computer Museum (ICM) is a non-profit organization based in Tukwila, Washington, United States. It focuses on the preservation, restoration, and public exhibition of vintage computing hardware and software. The museum operates as a 501(c)(3) organization and is affiliated with the SDF Public Access Unix System, a 501(c)(7) member-supported initiative.

== Collections ==
The museum works to preserve and document the evolution of computing through hands-on, functional exhibits. It maintains historically significant hardware and software while providing public access to operational legacy systems. The museum integrates modern interfaces and remote access capabilities to facilitate education and research.

The museum holds approximately 6,000 computing artifacts, including minicomputers, workstations, computer terminals, magnetic media, documentation, and software. Cataloging efforts are ongoing. The collection is actively maintained and augmented through donations and targeted acquisitions. It includes part of the former collection of the Living Computers: Museum + Labs, which closed in 2020.

== Exhibits and systems ==
ICM restores and operates legacy computing systems with an emphasis on original functionality. These systems are accessible for interactive use on-site and remotely for members. Restoration includes preservation of rare hardware and recovery of original software environments.

== Events ==
The museum hosts public events and community meetups, including the Interim Computer Festival, which attracts retrocomputing enthusiasts, collectors, and exhibitors. Events are held at INTRASPACE in Seattle and other partner venues.

== Location and visiting ==
The museum is located at 998 Industry Drive, Tukwila, Washington. It is open to members by appointment and during scheduled hours, typically Sundays and Mondays from 10:00 to 17:00.

== Membership and governance ==
ICM offers tiered membership levels with benefits including museum access, event participation, and remote system access. Membership fees support operational costs, acquisitions, and restoration projects.

The museum is managed by a small team of caretakers and volunteers. It is funded through memberships, donations, and community support. Governance aligns with its non-profit status and educational charter.

== Reports and activities ==
ICM publishes monthly Vintage Systems Reports that document restoration progress, system milestones, and community engagement. Notable highlights include:

- October 2024: Launch of the BOOTSTRAP membership tier and preparations for the Interim Computer Festival.
- November 2024: Six JSYS+ members visited during Thanksgiving weekend. Events hosted at INTRASPACE.
- January 2025: Focused on the continued operation of M‑NET, one of the oldest public access UNIX systems.
- April 2025: Public visiting hours confirmed and facility location documented.
- May 2025: Regular operations reaffirmed at the Tukwila location.

These reports provide visibility into technical milestones, membership activity, infrastructure, and event hosting.
