= Living Computers: Museum + Labs =

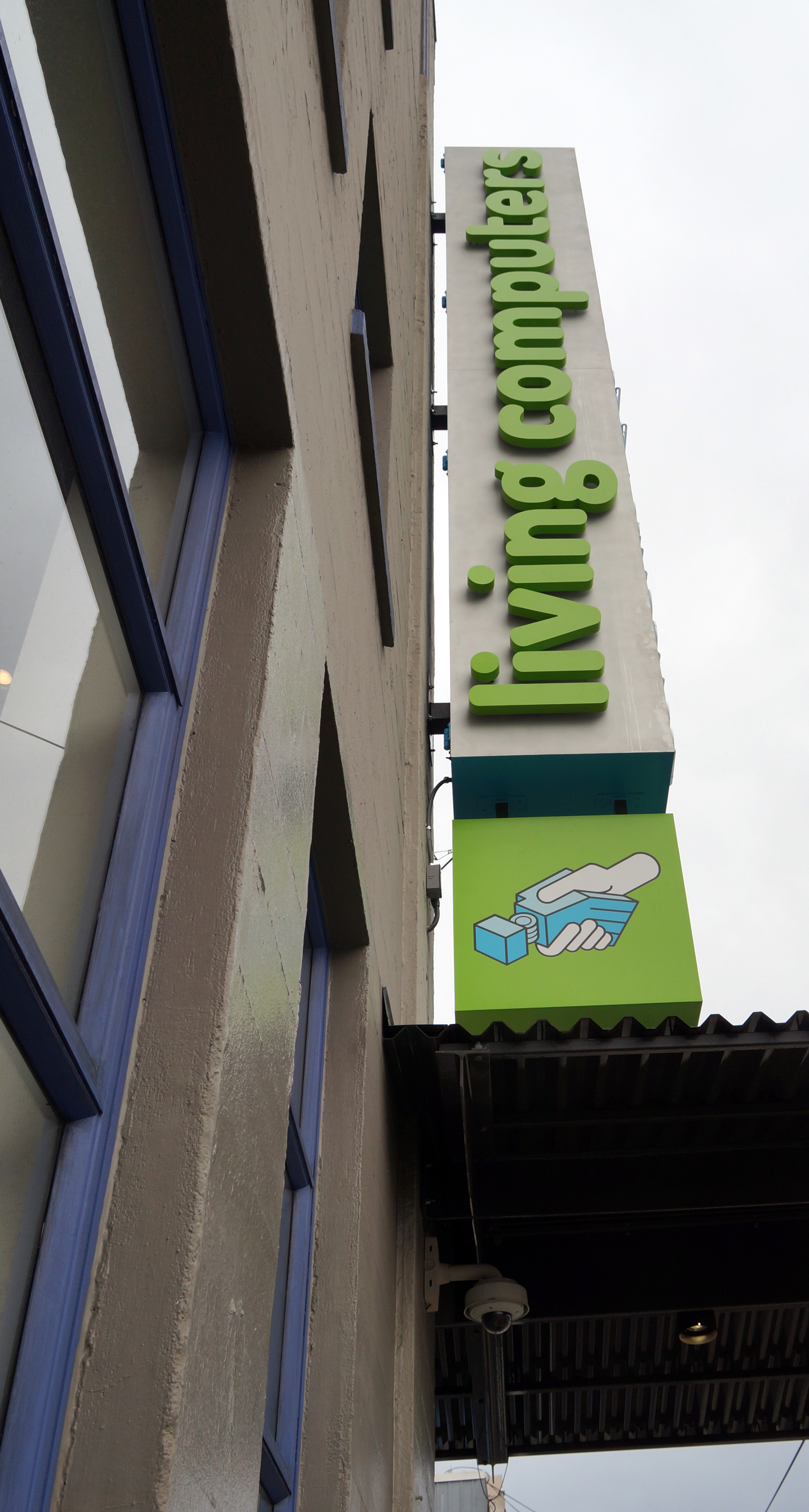
- Exterior of the museum
- Established: October 25, 2012
- Dissolved: June 2024
- Location: 2245 1st Avenue South; Seattle, Washington, U.S.
- Coordinates: 47.582487°N 122.334708°W
- Type: Computer museum
- Key holdings: PDP-10, IBM Mainframes, Apple 1, PLATO
- Founder: Paul Allen
- Curator: Aaron Alcorn
- Public transit access: King County Metro, Link light rail
- Parking: Onsite and Street Parking
- Website: www.livingcomputers.org

Living Computers: Museum + Labs (LCM+L) was a computer and technology museum located in the SoDo neighborhood of Seattle, Washington. LCM+L showcased vintage computers which provided interactive sessions, either through time-sharing operating systems or single-user interfaces. This gave users a chance to actually use the computers online or in-person in the museum. An expansion had added direct touch experiences with contemporary technologies such as self-driving cars, the internet of things, big data, and robotics. LCM+L had also hosted a wide range of educational programs and events in their state-of-the art classroom and lab spaces.

According to an archived version of LCM+L's website, their goal was "to breathe life back into our machines so the public can experience what it was like to see them, hear them, and interact with them. We make our systems accessible by allowing people to come and interact with them, and by making them available over the Internet."

The museum closed in February 2020 due to the COVID-19 pandemic. Part of its collection was auctioned off, and the rest was split between two museums.

== History ==
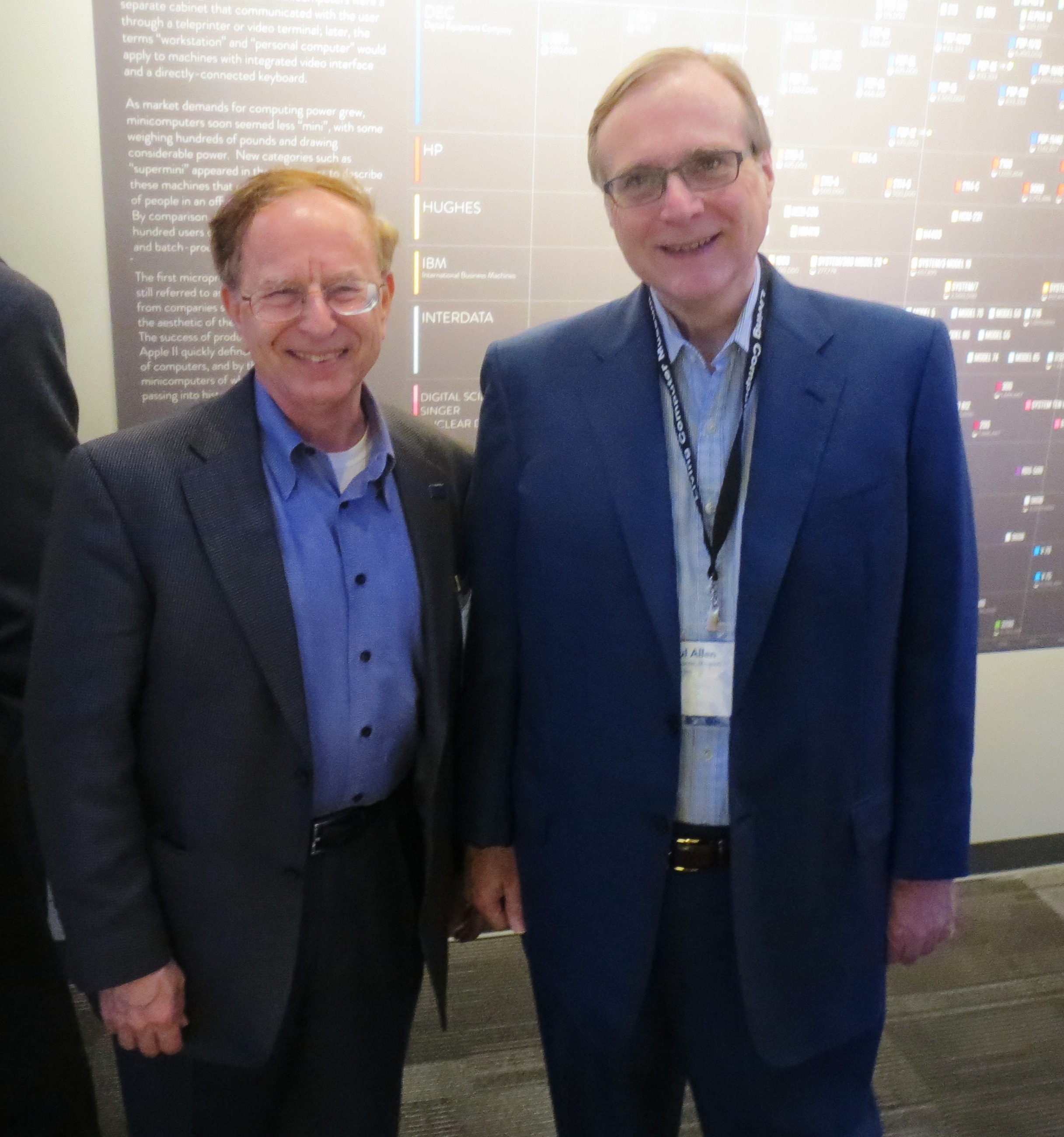
Harry Garland and Paul Allen at an event honoring computer pioneers at the museum in April 2013

LCM+L (originally known as Living Computer Museum, and before that, PDPplanet.com) was founded by Microsoft co-founder Paul Allen, on January 9, 2006. Through PDPplanet, users were able to Telnet into vintage devices and experience timesharing computing on equipment from Digital Equipment Corporation (DEC) and XKL.

Users around the world could request a login through the LCM+L website and telnet into systems from XKL, DEC, IBM, Xerox Sigma, AT&T, and CDC.

The museum opened to the public on October 25, 2012, and guests could visit in person to interact with the collection of mainframes, minicomputers, microcomputers and peripherals the museum had on display. Various and changing exhibits in the museum showed how much computers and technology had changed over the last 50 years and were changing still. In 2013, Seattle Weekly voted the museum the "Best Geeky Museum" because it highlighted "an essential part of Seattle binary history - the founding of Microsoft and its role in establishing Seattle as a tech-driven industry".

On November 18, 2016, the institution changed its name to Living Computers: Museum + Labs to reflect its enlarged goals of igniting curiosity through direct touch experiences with contemporary technologies as well as vintage computers.

The museum closed in February 2020 and did not reopen afterward due to the COVID-19 pandemic. In June 2024, The Paul Allen Estate announced that the museum would be permanently closed. Some of the museum's collection, most of which was owned by the Estate and not the museum itself, was auctioned off by Christie's. The auction was held online from 23 August to 12 September 2024 and raised $3,635,982 as part of the Gen One: Innovations from the Paul G. Allen Collection auction series. The rest of the collection was split between The Interim Computer Museum in Tukwila, Washington and the Mimms Museum of Technology and Art in Roswell, Georgia.

== Collections and exhibits ==
The collection consists of publicly donated items and Paul Allen's personal collection. The working computers on display included one supercomputer, seven mainframes, 10 minicomputers, and over three dozen microcomputers.

Various artifacts from the museum were borrowed and featured in TV shows such as Mad Men and Halt and Catch Fire.

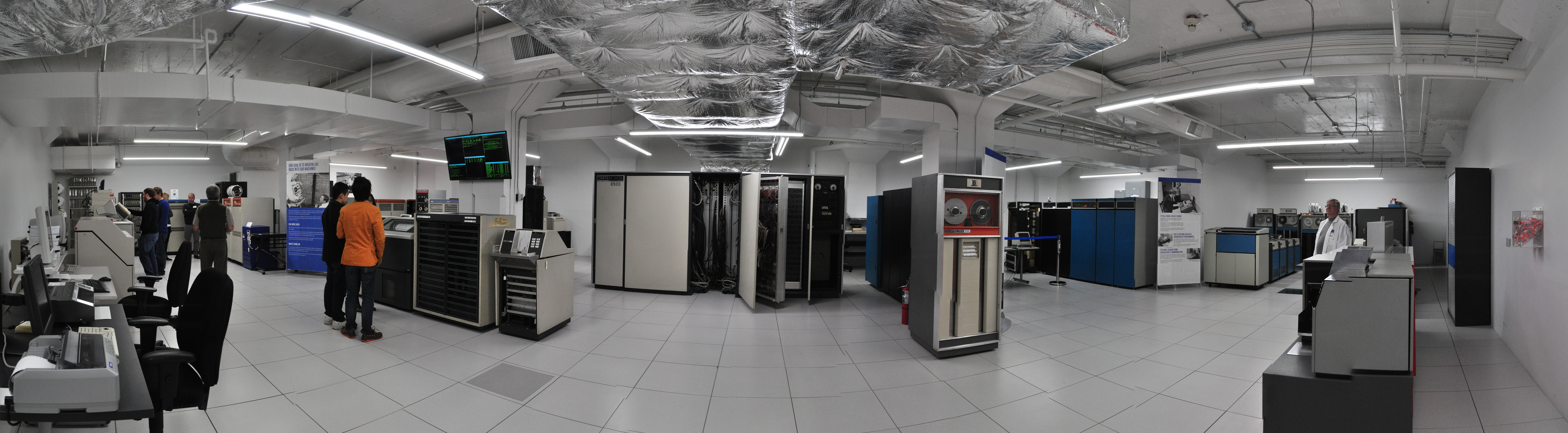
A roughly 180° panorama of the "conditioned" room at the Living Computer Museum containing mainframes and large minicomputers

=== Computers ===
Manufacturer	Model	Type	Year Introduced	Available for public use	Telnet access
Amazon	Kindle 1	hand-held	2007	Yes	No
Amiga	500	microcomputer	1987	Yes	No
Apple	Apple 1	microcomputer	1976	Yes	No
Apple	II	microcomputer	1977	Yes	No
Apple	IIe	microcomputer	1983	Yes	No
Apple	III	microcomputer	1980	Yes	No
Apple	Lisa 2	microcomputer	1984	Yes	No
Apple	iMac G3	microcomputer	1998	Yes	No
Apple	Macintosh SE	microcomputer	1987	Yes	No
Apple	Power Mac G4	microcomputer	1999	Yes	No
AT&T	DMD 5620 / 3B2	minicomputer	1983	Yes	Yes
Atari	2600	video game console	1977	Yes	No
Atari	400	microcomputer	1979	Yes	No
Atari	1040 ST	microcomputer	1985	Yes	No
Columbia Data Products	MPC 1600	microcomputer	1982	Yes	No
Commodore	PET	microcomputer	1977	Yes	No
Commodore	64	microcomputer	1982	Yes	No
Compaq	DeskPro 386S	microcomputer	1989	Yes	No
Compaq	Portable	microcomputer	1983	Yes	No
Control Data	CDC 6500	mainframe	1967	No	Yes
Control Data	DD60 monitor	operator console	1964	No	No
Control Data	405 card reader	peripheral	1964	No	No
Control Data	CDC 679-6 magnetic tape transport	peripheral	1964	No	No
Cray	Cray-1	mainframe	1975	No	No
Cromemco	Z-2D	microcomputer	1978	Yes	No
Data General	Nova	minicomputer	1969	Yes	No
DEC	PDP-7	minicomputer	1964	No	No
DEC	PDP-8/E	minicomputer	1970	Yes	No
DEC	PDP-10 KA10 (DECsystem-10)	mainframe	1968	No	No
DEC	PDP-10 KI10 (DECsystem-10)	mainframe	1971	No	No
DEC	PDP-10 KL10 (DECSYSTEM-2065)	mainframe	1974	Yes	Yes
DEC	PDP-10 KL10 (DECSYSTEM-1095)	mainframe	1974	Yes	Yes
DEC	PDP-10 KS10 (DECSYSTEM-2020)	mainframe	1979	Yes	Yes
DEC	PDP-11/70	minicomputer	1975	Yes	Yes
DEC	PDP-12	minicomputer	1969	No	No
DEC	VAX-11/780-5	minicomputer	1982	Yes	Yes
DEC	VT131	terminal	1981	Yes	No
Dell	Dimension XPS B733	microcomputer	1999	Yes	No
E.S.R.	Digi-Comp II reproduction	toy computer	1965 (original patent); 2012 (reproduction)	Yes	No
Honeywell	6180 DPS-8/M maintenance panel and Multics emulator	peripheral; emulation of mainframe	1973 (mainframe)	No	No
IBM	System/360 Model 30 mainframe	mainframe	1964	No	No
IBM	System/360 Model 91 front panel	peripheral	1966	No	No
IBM	029 card punch	peripheral	1964	Yes	No
IBM	4361	mainframe	1983	Yes	Yes
IBM	Personal Computer 5150	microcomputer	1981	Yes	No
IBM	PCjr	microcomputer	1984	Yes	No
IBM	PC/AT	microcomputer	1984	Yes	No
IMLAC Corporation	PDS-1 "sImlac" emulator	emulation of minicomputer	1970s (minicomputer); 2017 (emulator)	Yes	No
IMSAI	8080	microcomputer	1975	Yes	No
Interdata	7/32	minicomputer	1974	Yes	Yes
MITS	Altair 8800	microcomputer	1975	Yes	No
Microsoft	PixelSense	microcomputer	2007	Yes	No
NeXT	NeXTcube	microcomputer	1990	Yes	No
Nintendo	NES-101	video game console	1993	Yes	No
Osborne	Executive	microcomputer	1982	Yes	No
PLATO	Terminal V	microcomputer	1976	Yes	No
Processor Technology	Sol-20	microcomputer	1976	Yes	No
Radio Shack	TRS-80 Model 4	microcomputer	1983	Yes	No
Sun Microsystems	3/160	microcomputer	1986	Yes	No
Tandy	1000	microcomputer	1984	Yes	No
Tandy	Color Computer 3	microcomputer	1986	Yes	No
Teletype	Model 33	terminal	1963	No	No
Teletype	Model 35	terminal	1963	No	No
Teletype	Model 37	terminal	1968	No	No
Texas Instruments	Speak & Spell Compact	hand-held	1982	Yes	No
Texas Instruments	TI-99/4A	microcomputer	1981	Yes	No
Xerox	Sigma 9	mainframe	1971	Yes	Yes
Xerox	Alto	minicomputer	1973	Yes	No
Xerox	Alto "ContrAlto" simulator	emulation of minicomputer	1973 (minicomputer); 2016 (emulator)	Yes	No
XKL	TOAD-1	mainframe	1995	Yes	No
XKL	TOAD-2	mainframe	2005	Yes	Yes
