= XKL =

American company that develops optical transport network technologies

XKL, LLC
- Type: Private
- Industry: Telecommunications; Optical networking Computer Networking
- Founded: 1991; 35 years ago
- Founder: Len Bosack
- Headquarters: Redmond, Washington, U.S.A
- Area served: Worldwide
- Key people: Len Bosack and Sandra Lerner
- Products: Darkstar Optical Network Hardware
- Website: www.xkl.com

XKL, LLC is an American company that develops optical transport networking technologies. Founded in 1991 and based in Redmond, Washington, XKL is led by Cisco Systems co-founder Len Bosack.

== History of XKL ==
In its earliest days XKL developed, and in 1995 introduced, the TOAD-1, a compact, modern replacement for PDP-10 systems, mainframe computer systems that had gone out of production.

== Products ==
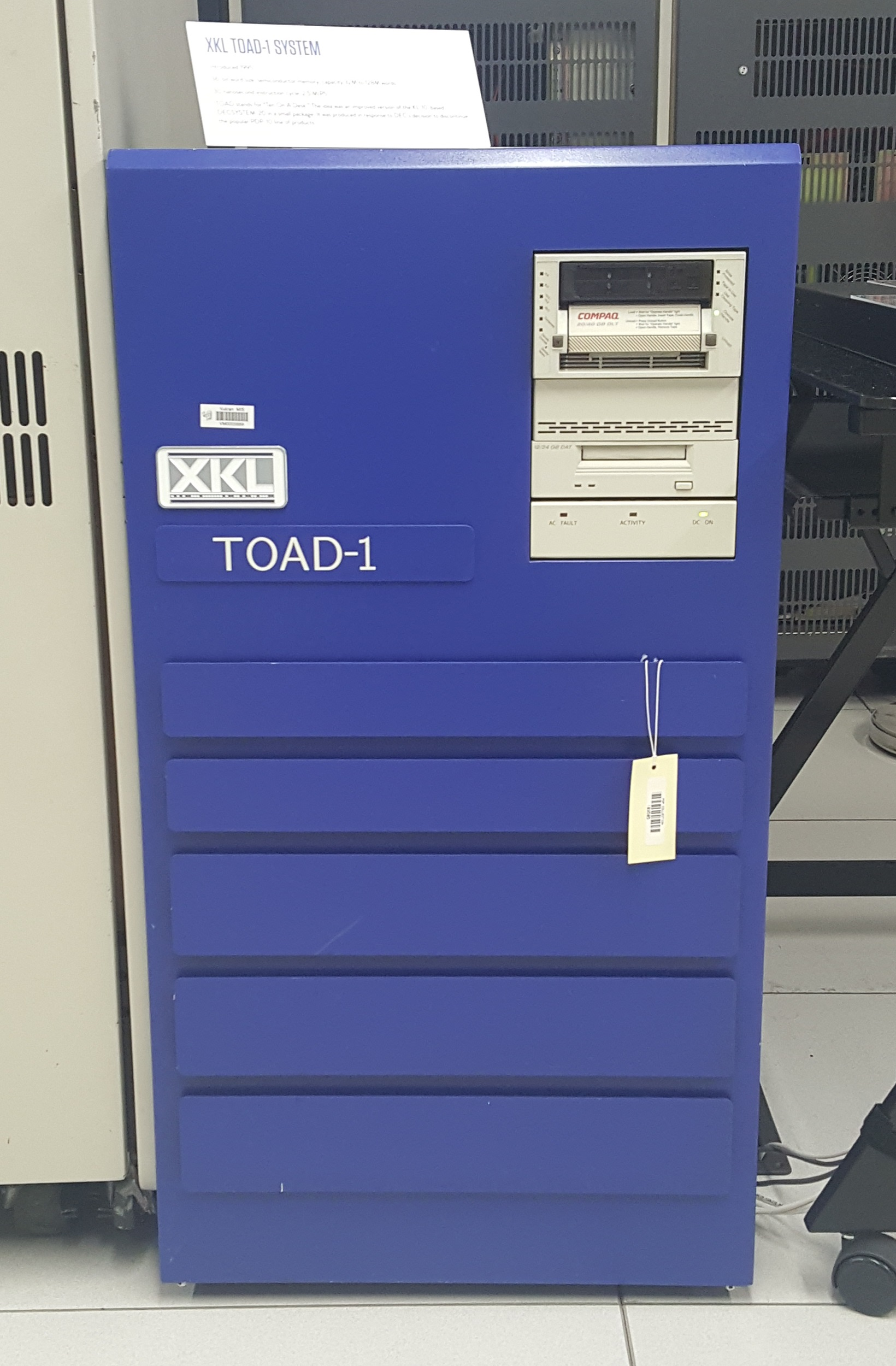
TOAD-1 unit on display at the Living Computer Museum in Seattle, WA

=== Current products ===
Products include transponder, muxponder, mux/demux (multiplexing/demultiplexing) and (optical) amplifier models.

==== DarkStar DQT10 Transponder ====
Supports 12, 24 or 36 10G channels.

==== DarkStar DQT100 Transponder ====
Aggregates up to 96 100G channels onto a single pair of fibers.

==== DarkStar DQT400 Transponder ====
Aggregates up to 48 100G / 400G channels

==== DarkStar DQM100 Muxponder ====
Aggregates up to 12 100G channels via statistical multiplexing.

==== DarkStar DQM10 Muxponder ====
Aggregates up to 36 10G channels.

==== DarkStar DSM10-10 Muxponder ====
Aggregates up to 100G services.

==== DarkStar DXM ====
First released in 2007, the Darkstar DXM is a high-performance optical switch first installed at the California Institute of Technology as part of their Supercomputing Bandwidth Challenge. It provides 5 times the bandwidth, in excess of 100 Gigabits/sec, than the existing system but is also smaller and uses less power.

=== Historical products ===
==== TOAD-1 ====
The TOAD-1 System, also known as TD-1, (Note: The TOAD-1 was referred to as the TOAD as a development codename and then changed to the TD-1 as the original marketing name. It was then switched back to TOAD-1 before production began.) was announced in 1993 and built as an extended version of the DECSYSTEM-20 from Digital Equipment Corporation. The original inspiration was to build a desktop version of the popular PDP-10 and the name began as an acronym for "Ten On A Desk". It was eventually built at XKL by veteran engineers from Cisco, DEC, Hewlett-Packard, and CDC.

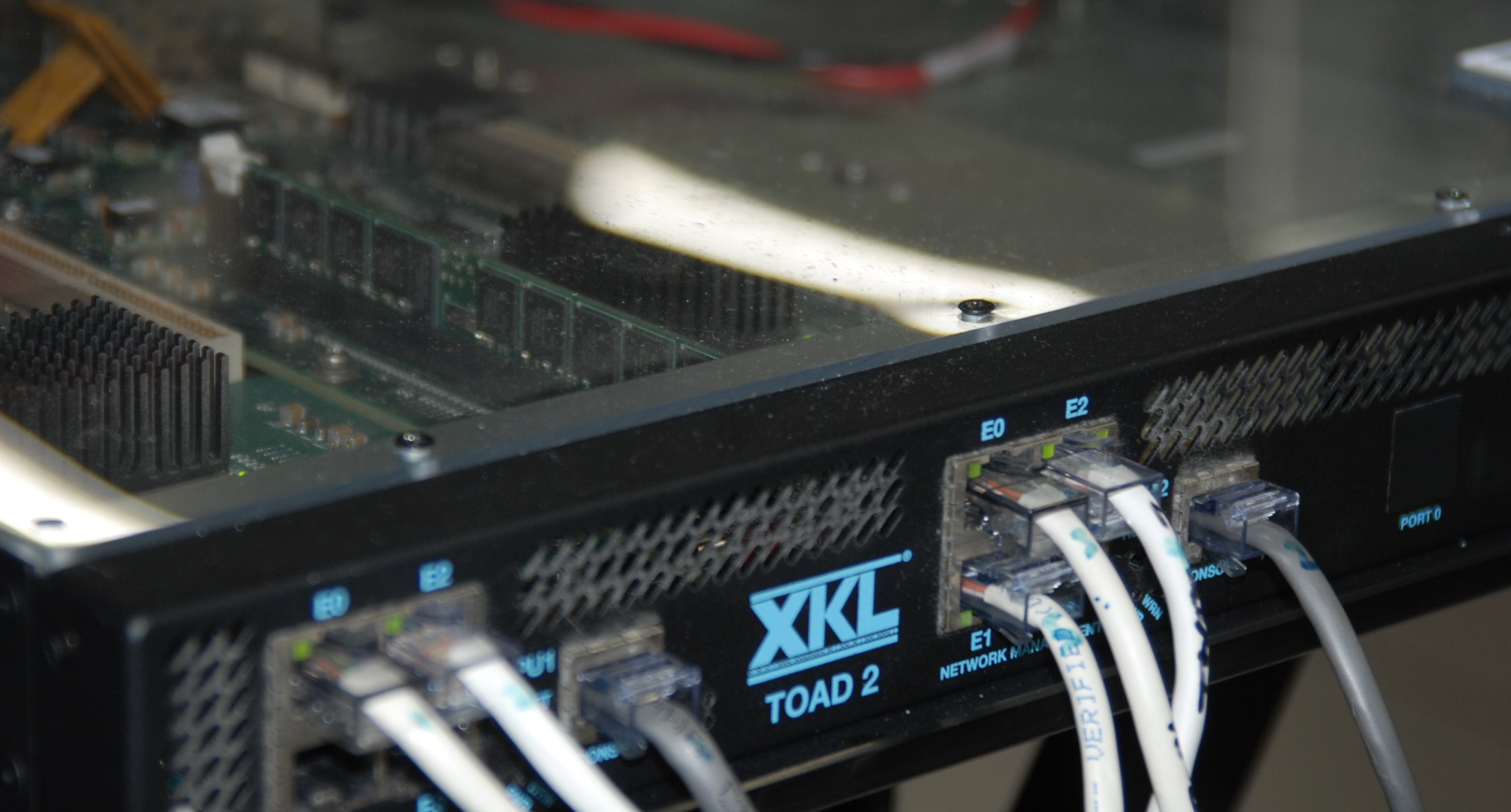
XKL TOAD-2 on display at the Living Computer Museum in Seattle, Washington.

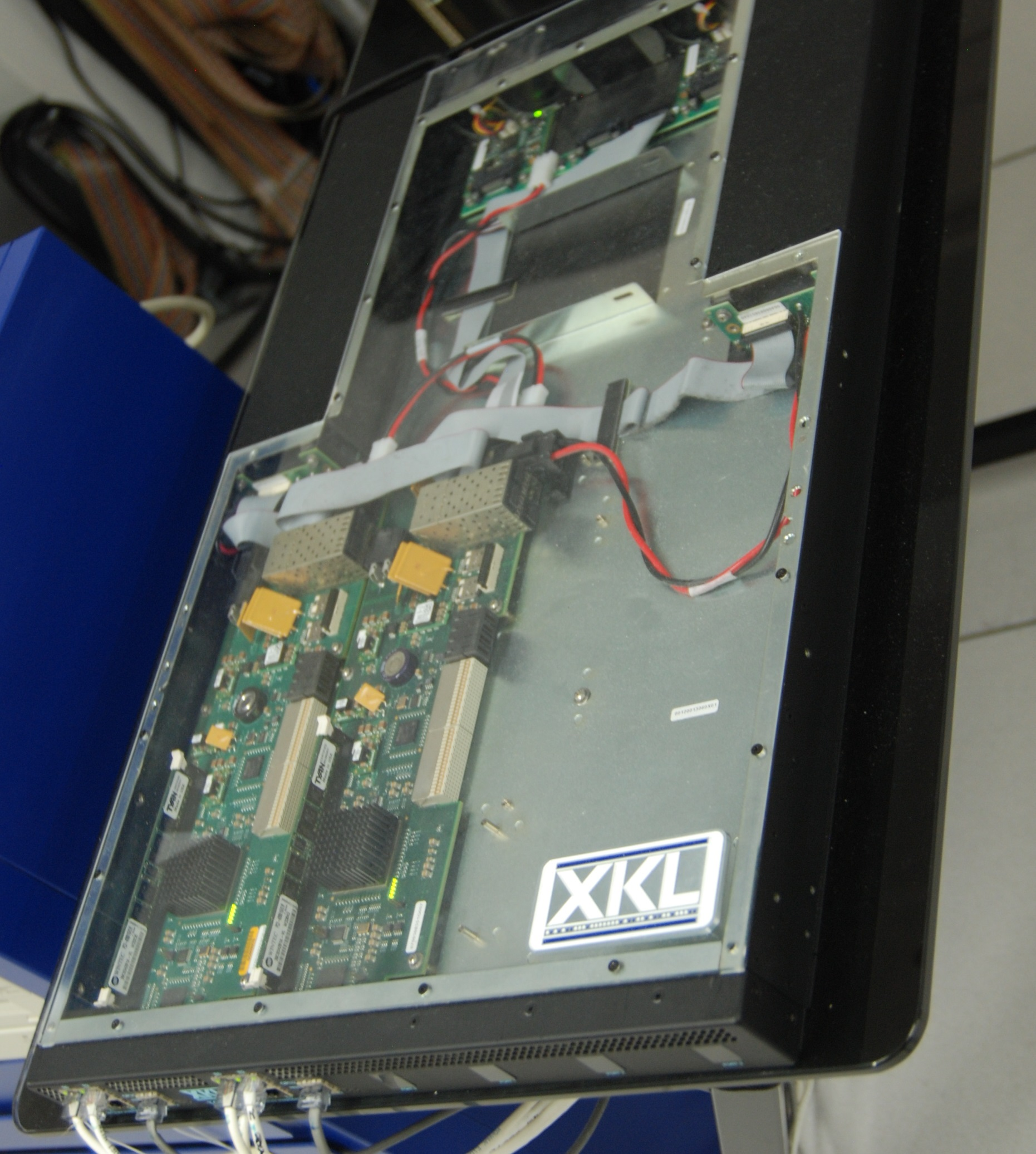
Full view of the XKL TOAD-2 on display at the Living Computer Museum in Seattle, Washington.

It was the first XKL product produced and it became available for purchase in late 1995. The TOAD-1 is a high-performance I/O oriented system with a 36-bit processor running TOPS-20. It is a multi-user system that can provide service to over 100 users at a time. The TOAD-1 architecture incorporates modern peripherals, and open bus architecture, expanded physical and virtual memory while maintaining the TOPS-20 user environment.

==== TOAD-2 ====
The TOAD-2 was built to replace the TOAD-1. It is a single chip reimplementation used as redundant control processors in networking equipment from XKL. It can be configured for TOPS-20 timesharing.

== See also ==
Other companies that produced PDP-10 compatible computers:

- Foonly
- Systems Concepts
