= SDF Public Access Unix System =

Shell provider

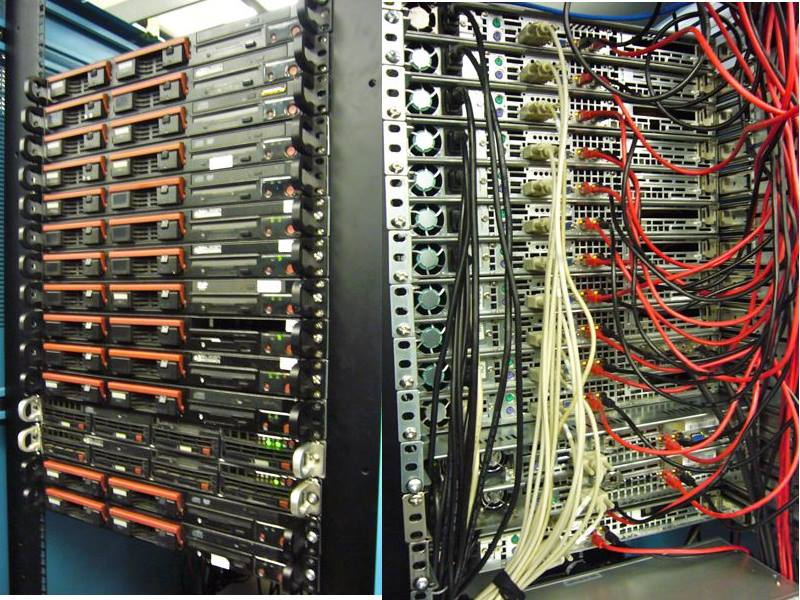
The heart of SDF with a few spares. This also includes the diaspora* pod, the Plan 9 cluster and the bifrost cluster. (tour 2012)

Super Dimension Fortress (abbreviated as SDF, also known as freeshell.org) is a non-profit public access UNIX shell provider on the Internet. It has been in continual operation since 1987 as a non-profit social club. The name is derived from the Japanese anime series Super Dimension Fortress Macross; the original SDF server was a Bulletin board system created by Ted Uhlemann for fellow Japanese anime fans. From its BBS roots, which have been well documented as part of the BBS: The Documentary project, SDF has grown into a feature-rich provider serving members around the world.

== Services ==
SDF provides free Unix shell access, web hosting and many other features at the user membership level. Additional programs, capabilities and resources are available at "patron" and "sustaining" level memberships, which are granted with one-time or recurring dues in support of the SDF system.

The SDF network of systems that serves its membership currently includes NetBSD servers for regular use (running on DEC Alpha- and AMD Opteron-powered hardware) as well as retrocomputing environments: a TWENEX system running the Panda Distribution TOPS-20 MONITOR 7.1 on two XKL TOAD-2 computers, a Symbolics Genera system, and an ITS system

SDF also hosts its own instances of social media websites from the fediverse, including a Mastodon microblogging service, a Pixelfed image sharing service, and a Lemmy link aggregator with discussion. In addition, SDF hosts a Matrix chat server.

=== Free Membership Services ===
SDF provides free Unix shell access and web hosting to its users. In addition, SDF provides increasingly rare services such as dial-up internet access, and Gopher hosting. SDF is one of very few organizations in the world still actively promoting the gopher protocol, an alternate protocol that existed at the introduction of the modern World Wide Web.

The system contains thousands of programs and utilities, including a command-line BBS called BBOARD, a chat program called COMMODE, email programs, webmail, social networking programs, developer tools and games. Most of the applications hosted at SDF are accessed via the command-line, and SDF provides K-12 and college classrooms the free use of computing resources for Unix education.

SDF also supports multiple retrocomputing experiences, including free user accounts on TOPS-20 and Symbolics Genera operating systems that are running live and accessible via the internet.

=== Dues-paying membership services ===
There are additional services that are made available on SDF systems to users who apply to be "patrons" and pay one-time dues of US$36 for "Lifetime Membership", and still more services available for at US$11/quarter "sustaining membership", including services such as NextCloud, and access to a large disc-array server. At the sustaining membership level, members are authorized to validate new users to SDF's free User level of membership (otherwise, new members may submit US$1 to be validated).

There are also specialized privileges which patron and sustaining level users can obtain to gain access to particular technologies, including mailing lists, Voice-over-IP, Databases, Virtual Private Network (VPN), and Domain registration.

== History ==
In 1987, Ted Uhlemann started SDF on an Apple IIe microcomputer running "Magic City Micro-BBS" under ProDOS. The system was run as a "Japanese Anime SIG" known as the SDF-1. In 1989, Uhlemann and Stephen Jones operated SDF very briefly as a DragCit Citadel BBS before attempting to use an Intel x86 UNIX clone called Coherent.

Unhappy with the restrictive menu driven structure of existing BBS systems, Uhlemann, Jones and Daniel Finster created a UNIX System V BBS in 1990, initially running on an i386 system, which later became an AT&T 3B2/400 and 500, and joined the lonestar.org UUCP network. Three additional phone lines were installed in late 1991.

After Uhlemann and Finster

In the fall of 1992, Uhlemann and Finster left SDF to start one of the first commercial Internet companies in Texas, Texas Metronet.

SDF continued to grow, expanding to ten lines in 1993 along with a SLIP connection provided by cirr.com. UUCP was still heavily relied upon for Usenet news and email.

Linux

In 1997, SDF (then with about 15,000 users) migrated to Linux. The migration to Linux marked a turning point, as the system started coming under attack like it never had before in its history. Jones calls the Linux period the dark age.

In part due to the number of attacks undertaken by malicious users against SDF, the years 2000 and 2001 saw SDF migrate from Linux to NetBSD and from Intel x86 to DEC Alpha. This migration included relocation of the servers from Lewisville, Texas to Seattle, Washington. The Linux system was officially decommissioned on August 17, 2001. The occasion was captured in a COMMODE Log preserved by one of SDF's users. (COMMODE is a DEC TOPS-20 chat system ported by Jones to Unix as an executable KornShell script.)

501(c)(7)

Although SDF Public Access UNIX System was registered as an operating business in 1993 according to the Dallas County Records Office, it wasn't until October 1, 2001, that the SDF Public Access UNIX System was formed as a Delaware not-for-profit corporation and subsequently granted 501(c)(7) non-profit membership club status by the IRS. SDF had operated under the auspice of the MALR corporation between 1995 and 2001.

As of May 2016, SDF was composed of 47,572 users from around the world. SDF users include engineers, computer programmers, students, artists and professionals.

NetBSD

SDF.org is a development site for NetBSD, and in 2018, SDF was the largest NetBSD installation in the world.
