= Xerox Sigma 9 =

General purpose computer

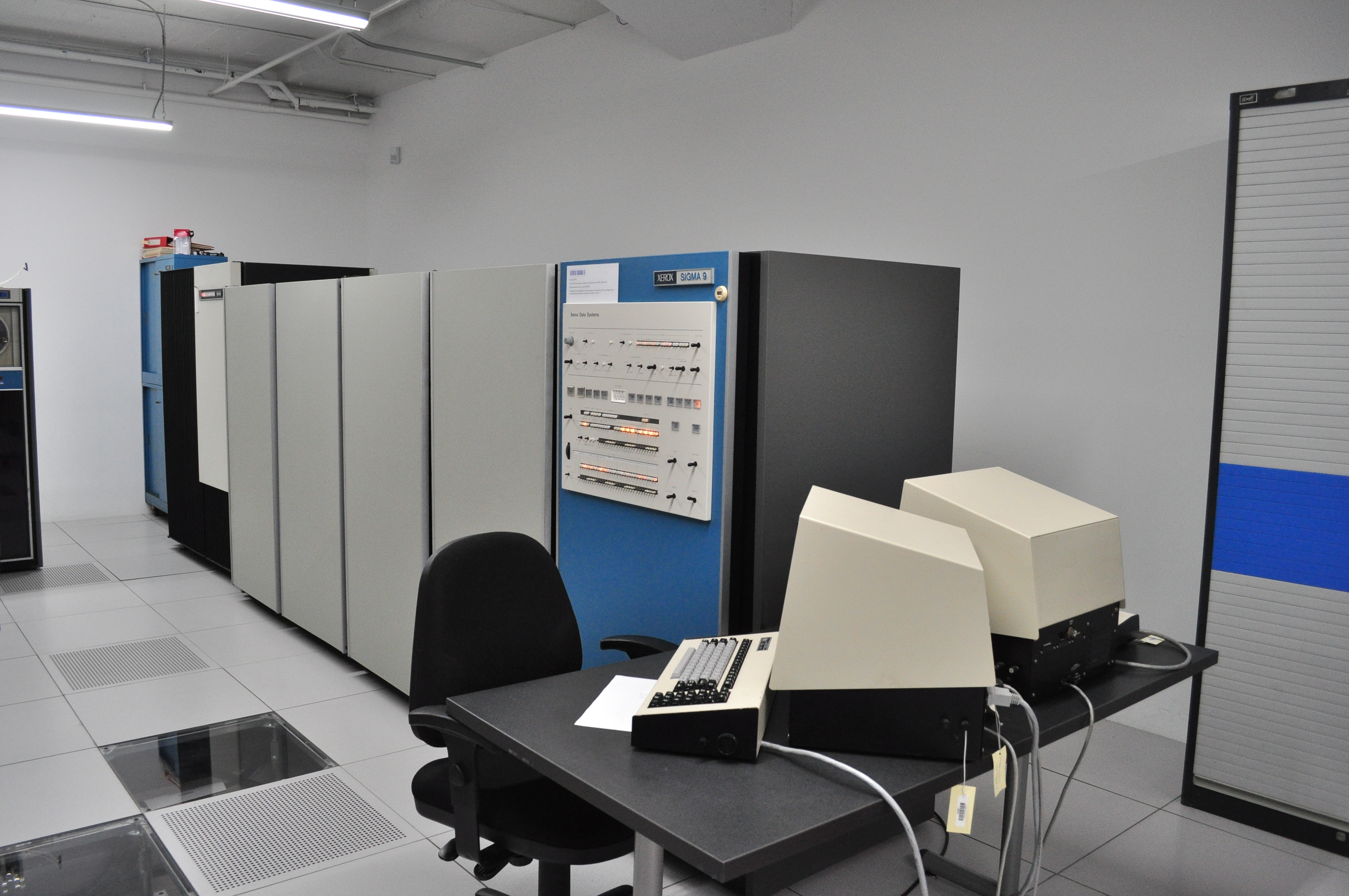
- Living Computer Museum - Xerox Sigma 9
- Developer: Xerox
- Product family: Xerox Sigma
- Released: 1970

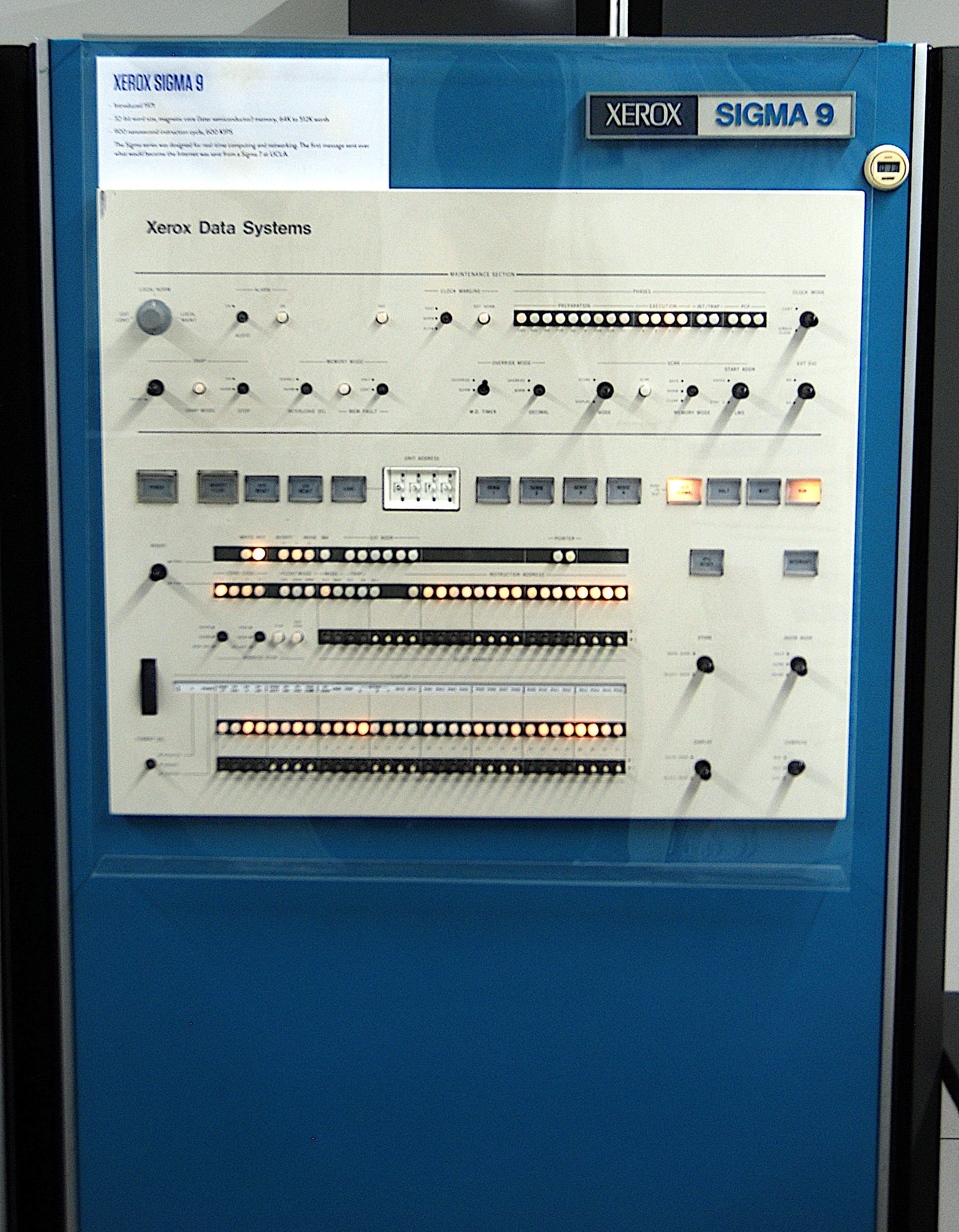
Front of the Xerox Sigma 9. On display at the Living Computer Museum in Seattle, Washington.

The Xerox Sigma 9, also known as the XDS Sigma 9, is a high-speed, general purpose computer.

Xerox first became interested in office automation through computers in 1969 and purchased Scientific Data Systems or SDS. They then renamed the division Xerox Data Systems or XDS; they saw limited success, and the division was ultimately sold to Honeywell at a significant loss.

The Sigma 9 was announced in 1970 and the first delivery was made in 1971. There were 3 models built, the Sigma 9, the Sigma 9 Model 2 and the Sigma 9 Model 3. The original was the most powerful and was universally applicable to all data processing applications at the time. The Model 2 was able to process in multi-programmed batch, remote batch, conversational time-sharing, real-time, and transaction processing modes. The Model 3 was designed for the scientific real-time community.

== Features ==
All models featured a CPU with at least a floating-point arithmetic unit, memory map with access protection, memory write protection, two real-time clocks, a power fail-safe, an external interface, ten internal interrupt levels, as well as a multiplexor input/output processor (MIOP) featuring Channel A with eight sub-channels.

Listed below are the individual specifications:

=== Sigma 9 ===
- CPU featuring:
  - Decimal arithmetic unit
  - Two 16-register general purpose register blocks
  - Interrupt control chassis with eight external interrupt levels
  - Memory reconfiguration control unit

=== Model 2 ===
- CPU featuring:
  - Decimal arithmetic unit
  - Two 16-register general purpose register blocks
  - Interrupt control chassis with two external interrupt levels
- Main memory of 32K words

=== Model 3 ===
- CPU featuring:
  - One 16-register general purpose register block
  - Interrupt control chassis with two external interrupt levels
- Main memory of 32K words
