= Start (command) =

Shell command

start
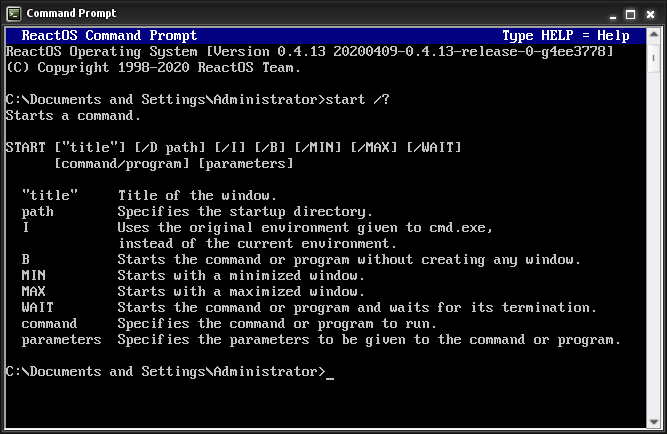
- The ReactOS start command
- Developer(s): IBM, Microsoft, ReactOS Contributors
- Operating system: OS/2, Microsoft Windows, ReactOS
- Type: Command

In computing, start is a command of the IBM OS/2, Microsoft Windows and ReactOS command-line interpreter cmd.exe (and some versions of COMMAND.COM) to start programs or batch files or to open files or directories using the default program. start is not available as a standalone program. The underlying Win32 API is ShellExecute.

The command is also one of the basic commands implemented in the Keyboard Monitor (KMON) of the DEC RT-11 operating system. The TOPS-10 and TOPS-20 operating systems also provide a start command. It is used to start a program in memory at a specified address.

== Other environments ==
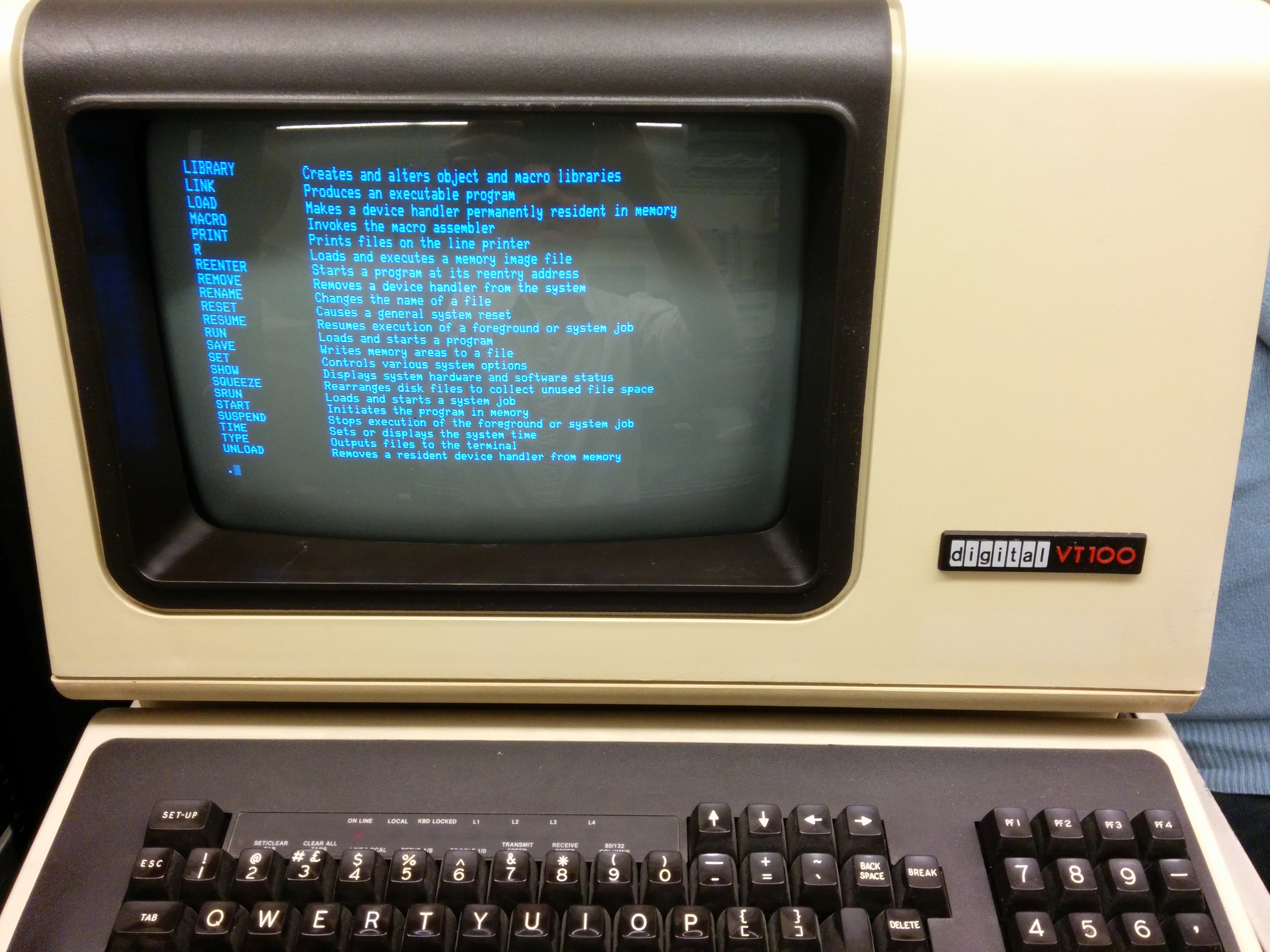
Description of the START command of RT-11SJ displayed on a VT100.

- Typical Unix shells (bash, etc.) have no built-in registry of file types and associated default applications. Linux command-line tools with similar functions include xdg-open and run-mailcap.
- On Cygwin, the command is implemented as the cygstart executable.
- In PowerShell, the Invoke-Item cmdlet is used to invoke an executable or open a file.
- On Apple macOS and MorphOS, the corresponding command is open.
- On Stratus OpenVOS it is start_process.

== Syntax ==
=== Windows, ReactOS ===
start ["title"] [/D path] [/I][/B][/MIN][/MAX][/WAIT] [command/program] [parameters]

"title" Title of the window.

Path Specifies the startup directory.

I Use the original environment given to cmd.exe, instead of the current environment.

B Starts the command or program without creating any window.

MIN Starts with a minimized window.

MAX Starts with a maximized window.

WAIT Starts the command or program and waits for its termination.

command Specifies the parameters to be given to the command or program.

== Examples ==
=== Windows, ReactOS ===
C:\>start notepad file.txt

C:\>start "C:\My Music\My Song.mp3"

C:\>start www.wikipedia.org

== See also ==
- Run command
- File association § Microsoft Windows
