= Run command =

Command used to begin execution of a program

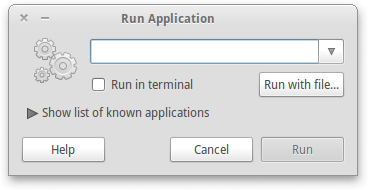
The Run... dialog box in GNOME

Run dialog box in Windows 11

The Run command on an operating system such as Microsoft Windows and Unix-like systems is used to directly open an application or document whose path is known.

== Overview ==
The command functions more or less like a single-line command-line interface. In the GNOME (a UNIX-like derivative) interface, the Run command is used to run applications via terminal commands. It can be accessed by pressing Alt+F2. KDE (a UNIX-like derivative) has similar functionality called KRunner. It is accessible via the same key binds.

The Multics shell includes a run command to run a command in an isolated environment. The DEC TOPS-10 and TOPS-20 Command Processor included a RUN command for running executable programs.

In the BASIC programming language, RUN is used to start program execution from direct mode, or to start an overlay program from a loader program.

== Accessing the Run command ==
Starting with Windows 95, the Run command is accessible through the Start menu and also through the shortcut key ⊞ Win+R. Although the Run command is still present in Windows Vista and later, it no longer appears directly on the Start menu by default, in favor of the new search box and a shortcut to the Run command in the Windows System sub-menu.

The Run command is launched in GNOME and KDE desktop environment by holding Alt+F2.

== Uses ==
Uses include bringing up webpages; for example, if a user were to bring up the Run command and type in http://www.example.com/, the user's default Web Browser would open that page. This allows user to not only launch http protocol, but also all registered URI schemes in OS and applications associated with them, like mailto and file.

In GNOME and KDE, the Run command acts as a location where applications and commands can be executed.

== See also ==
- KDE Plasma 4
- Start (command)
