= Teletype Model 37 =

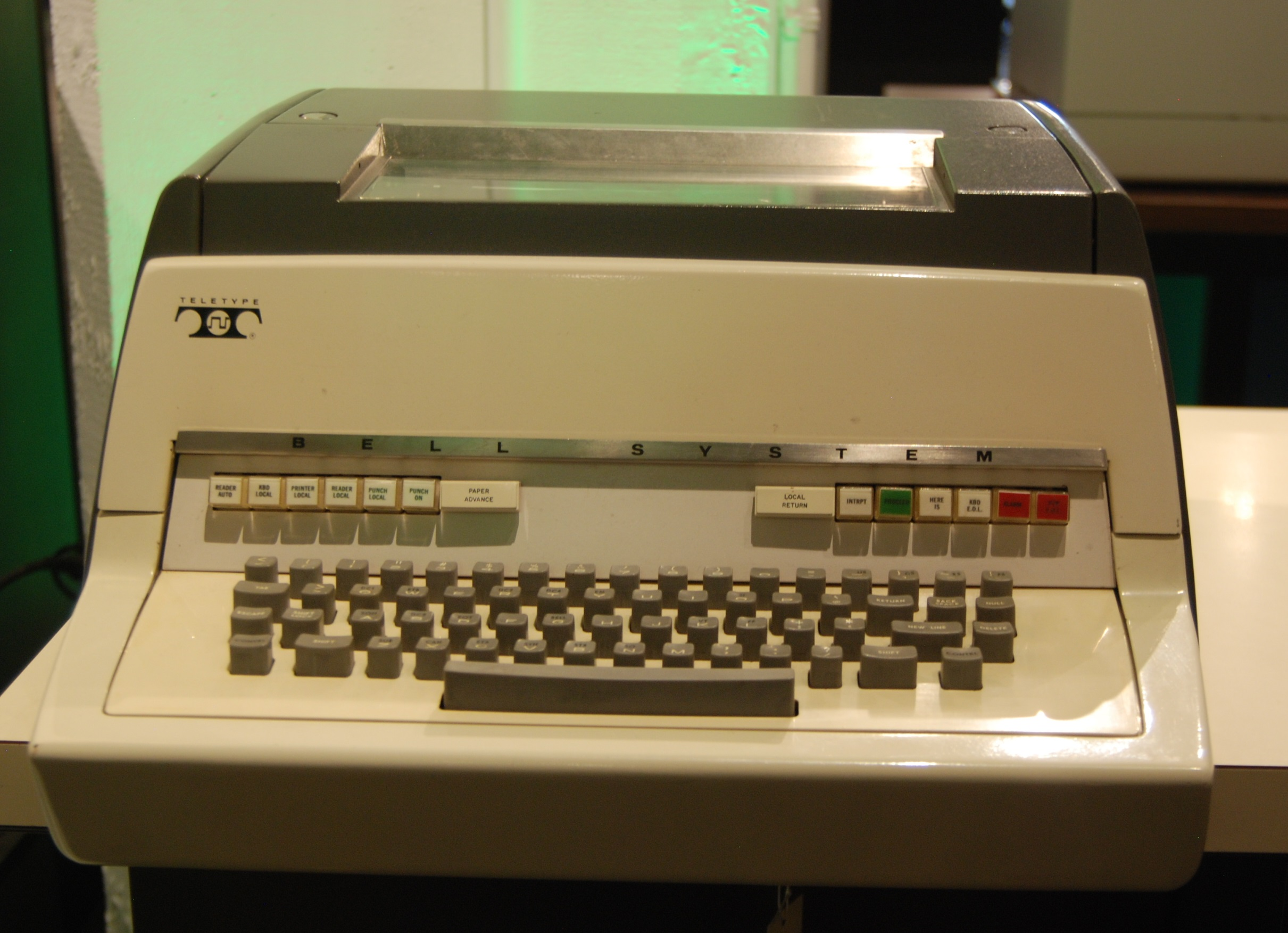
Teletype Model 37. On display at the Living Computer Museum in Seattle, Washington.

The Teletype Model 37 is an electromechanical teleprinter manufactured by the Teletype Corporation in 1968. Electromechanical user interfaces would be superseded as a year later in 1969 the Computer Terminal Corporation introduced the electronic terminal with a screen.

== Features ==
The Model 37 came with many features including upper- and lowercase letters, reverse page feed for printing charts, red and black ink, and optional tape and punch reader. It handled speeds up to 150 Baud (15 characters/second). This made it 50% faster than its predecessor, the Model 33.

The Model 37 terminal utilizes a serial input / output 10 unit code signal consisting of a start bit, seven information bits, an even parity bit and a stop bit. It was produced in ASR (Automatic Send and Receive)also known as the Model 37/300, KSR (Keyboard Send and Receive) also known as the Model 37/200 and RO (Receive Only) also known as the Model 37/100.

The Model 37 handles all 128 ASCII code combinations. It uses a six-row removable typebox with provisions for 96 type pallet positions. When the Shift-Out feature is included, the six-row typebox is replaced with a seven-row typebox allowing 112 pallet positions, or it can be replaced with an eight-row typebox allowing 128 type pallet positions.

== Technical specifications ==
- The Model 37 RO and KSR are 36.25 inches high, 27.5 inches deep and 22.5 inches deep. The ASR is 36.25 inches high, 44.5 inches wide and 27.5 inches deep.
- The ASR weighs approximately 340 pounds and KSR and RO weighs approximately 185 pounds.
- The Model 37 interface meets the requirements of EIA RS-232-B and has a recommended maintenance interval of every six months or every 1500 hours.
- Power Requirements - 115VAC ± 10%, 60 Hz ± .45 Hz, RO is approximately 200 Watts, KSR is approximately 300 Watts, ASR is approximately 550 Watts.

== Fun Facts ==
- Most Model 37s were re-purchased from customers and sold to the Soviet Union with antiquated mainframe computer systems.
