= Open (process) =

NeXTSTEP and macOS command line process

open is a NeXTSTEP and macOS command line process that opens files, folders or URLs in the GUI as though the user had double clicked on them. Files will be opened in the default application for their type, folders will be opened in the Finder or file system GUI, and URLs will be opened in the default browser.

It is based on the AppKit API -[NSWorkspace openURL:], which is stubbed to other OS alternatives on GNUstep if a GS application is not registered for a file.

== Other OS alternatives ==
- Microsoft Windows: start
- X11 (Unix-like systems):
  - xdg-utils: xdg-open
  - KDE: kfmclient exec
  - GNOME: gnome-open
