= TOPS-20 =

Operating system by Digital Equipment Corporation

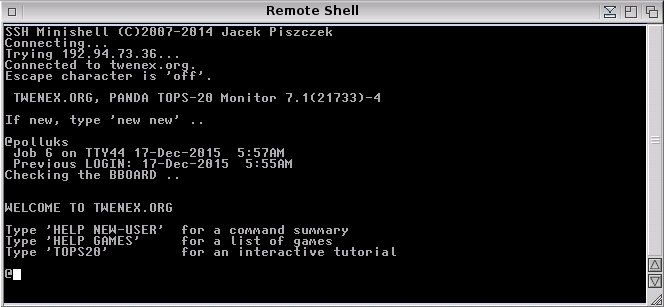
- Screenshot of login prompt of a TOPS-20 system
- Developer: Digital Equipment Corporation
- Written in: Assembly language
- OS family: TENEX
- Working state: Discontinued
- Initial release: 1976; 50 years ago
- Latest release: 7.1 / June 1988; 37 years ago
- Marketing target: Mainframe computers
- Available in: English
- Supported platforms: PDP-10
- Default user interface: Command-line interface
- License: Proprietary
- Preceded by: TENEX

The TOPS-20 operating system by Digital Equipment Corporation (DEC) is a proprietary OS used on some of DEC's 36-bit mainframe computers. The Hardware Reference Manual was described as for "DECsystem-10/DECSYSTEM-20 Processor" (meaning the DEC PDP-10 and the DECSYSTEM-20).

TOPS-20 began in 1969 as the TENEX operating system of Bolt, Beranek and Newman (BBN) and shipped as a product by DEC starting in 1976. TOPS-20 is almost entirely unrelated to the similarly named TOPS-10, but it was shipped with the PA1050 TOPS-10 Monitor Calls emulation facility which allowed most, but not all, TOPS-10 executables to run unchanged. As a matter of policy, DEC did not update PA1050 to support later TOPS-10 additions except where required by DEC software.

TOPS-20 competed with TOPS-10, ITS and WAITS—all of which were notable time-sharing systems for the PDP-10 during this timeframe. TOPS-20 is informally known as TWENEX.

== TENEX ==
TOPS-20 was based upon the TENEX operating system, which had been created by Bolt Beranek and Newman for Digital's PDP-10 computer. After Digital started development of the KI-10 version of the PDP-10, an issue arose: by this point TENEX was the most popular customer-written PDP-10 operating systems, but it would not run on the new, faster KI-10s. To correct this problem, the DEC PDP-10 sales manager purchased the rights to TENEX from BBN and set up a project to port it to the new machine. In the end, very little of the original TENEX code remained, and Digital ultimately named the resulting operating system TOPS-20.

== PA1050 ==
Some of what came with TOPS-20 was merely an emulation of the TOPS-10 Operating System's calls. These were known as UUO's, standing for Unimplemented User Operation, and were needed both for compilers, which were not 20-specific, to run, as well as user-programs written in these languages. The package that was mapped into a user's address space was named PA1050: PA as in PAT as in compatibility; 10 as in DEC or PDP 10; 50 as in a PDP 10 Model 50, 10/50, 1050.

Sometimes PA1050 was referred to as PAT, a name that was a good fit to the fact that PA1050, "was simply unprivileged user-mode code" that "performed the requested action, using JSYS calls where necessary."

== TOPS-20 capabilities ==
The major ways to get at TOPS-20 capabilities, and what made TOPS-20 important, were

- Commands entered via the command processor, EXEC.EXE
- JSYS (Jump to System) calls from MACro-language (.MAC) programs

The "EXEC" accomplished its work primarily using

- internal code, including calls via JSYS
- requesting services from "GALAXY" components (e.g. spoolers)

=== Command processor ===
Rather advanced for its day were some TOPS-20-specific features:

- Command completion
- Dynamic help in the form of

- noise-words - typing DIR and then pressing the ESCape key resulted in

DIRectory (of files)

typing I and pressing the Esc key resulted in

Information (about)

One could then type ? to find out what operands were permitted/required. Pressing Ctrl+T displays status information.

=== Available programming languages ===
Some available programming languages were FORTRAN, COBOL, BASIC, ALGOL, CPL, APL, BLISS, and Pascal.

=== Commands ===
The following list of commands are supported by the TOPS-20 Command Processor.

- ACCESS
- ADVISE
- APPEND
- ARCHIVE
- ASSIGN
- ATTACH
- BACKSPACE
- BLANK
- BREAK
- BUILD
- CANCEL
- CLOSE
- COMPILE
- CONNECT
- CONTINUE
- COPY
- CREATE
- CREF
- CSAVE
- DAYTIME
- DDT
- DEASSIGN
- DEBUG
- DEFINE
- DELETE
- DEPOSIT
- DETACH
- DIRECTORY
- DISABLE
- DISCARD
- DISMOUNT
- EDIT
- ENABLE
- END-ACCESS
- EOF
- ERUN
- EXAMINE
- EXECUTE
- EXPUNGE
- FDIRECTORY
- FORK
- FREEZE
- GET
- HELP
- INFORMATION
- KEEP
- LOAD
- LOGIN
- LOGOUT
- MERGE
- MODIFY
- MOUNT
- PERUSE
- PLOT
- POP
- PRINT
- PUNCH
- PUSH
- RECEIVE
- REENTER
- REFUSE
- REMARK
- RENAME
- RESET
- RETRIEVE
- REWIND
- RUN
- SAVE
- SEND
- SET
- SET HOST
- SKIP
- START
- SUBMIT
- SYSTAT
- TAKE
- TALK
- TDIRECTORY
- TERMINAL
- TRANSLATE
- TYPE
- UNATTACH
- UNDELETE
- UNKEEP
- UNLOAD
- VDIRECTORY

=== JSYS features ===
JSYS stands for Jump to SYStem. Operands were at times memory addresses. "TOPS-20 allows you to use 18-bit or 30-bit addresses. Some monitor calls require one kind, some the other; some calls accept either kind. Some monitor calls use only 18 bits to hold an address. These calls interpret 18-bit addresses as locations in the current section."

Internally, files were first identified, using a GTJFN (Get Job File Number) JSYS, and then that JFN number was used to open (OPENF) and manipulate the file's contents.

== PCL (Programmable Command Language) ==
PCL (Programmable Command Language) is a programming language that runs under TOPS-20. PCL source programs are, by default, stored with Filetype .PCL, and enable extending the TOPS-20 EXEC via a verb named DECLARE. Newly compiled commands then become functionally part of the EXEC.

=== PCL language features ===
PCL includes:

- flow control: DO While/Until, CASE/SELECT, IF-THEN-ELSE, GOTO
- character string operations (length, substring, concatenation)
- access to system information (date/time, file attributes, device characteristics)

== TOPS-20 today ==
Paul Allen maintained several publicly accessible historic computer systems before his death, including an XKL TOAD-2 running TOPS-20. Currently TOPS-20 is available in emulation with Mark Crispin's TOPS-20 Panda Distribution.

See also SDF Public Access Unix System.

== See also ==
- Time-sharing system evolution
