= DECSYSTEM-20 =

Type of mainframe computer

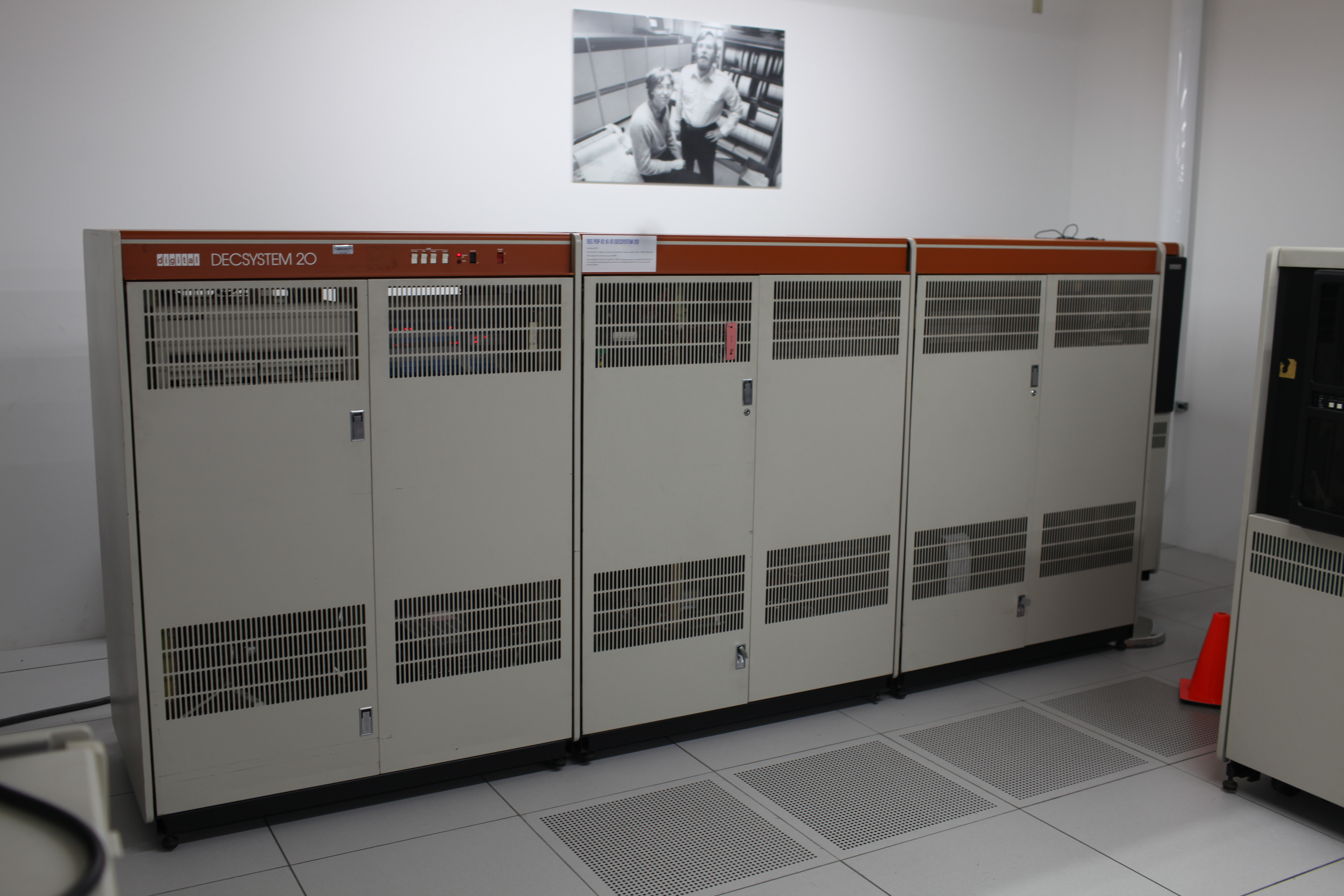
- DECSYSTEM-20 KL-10 (1974) at the Living Computer Museum
- Also known as: PDP-20
- Developer: Digital Equipment Corporation
- Product family: Programmed Data Processor
- Type: Mainframe computer
- Released: 1977; 49 years ago
- Operating system: TOPS-20
- Platform: DEC 36-bit
- Related: PDP-10

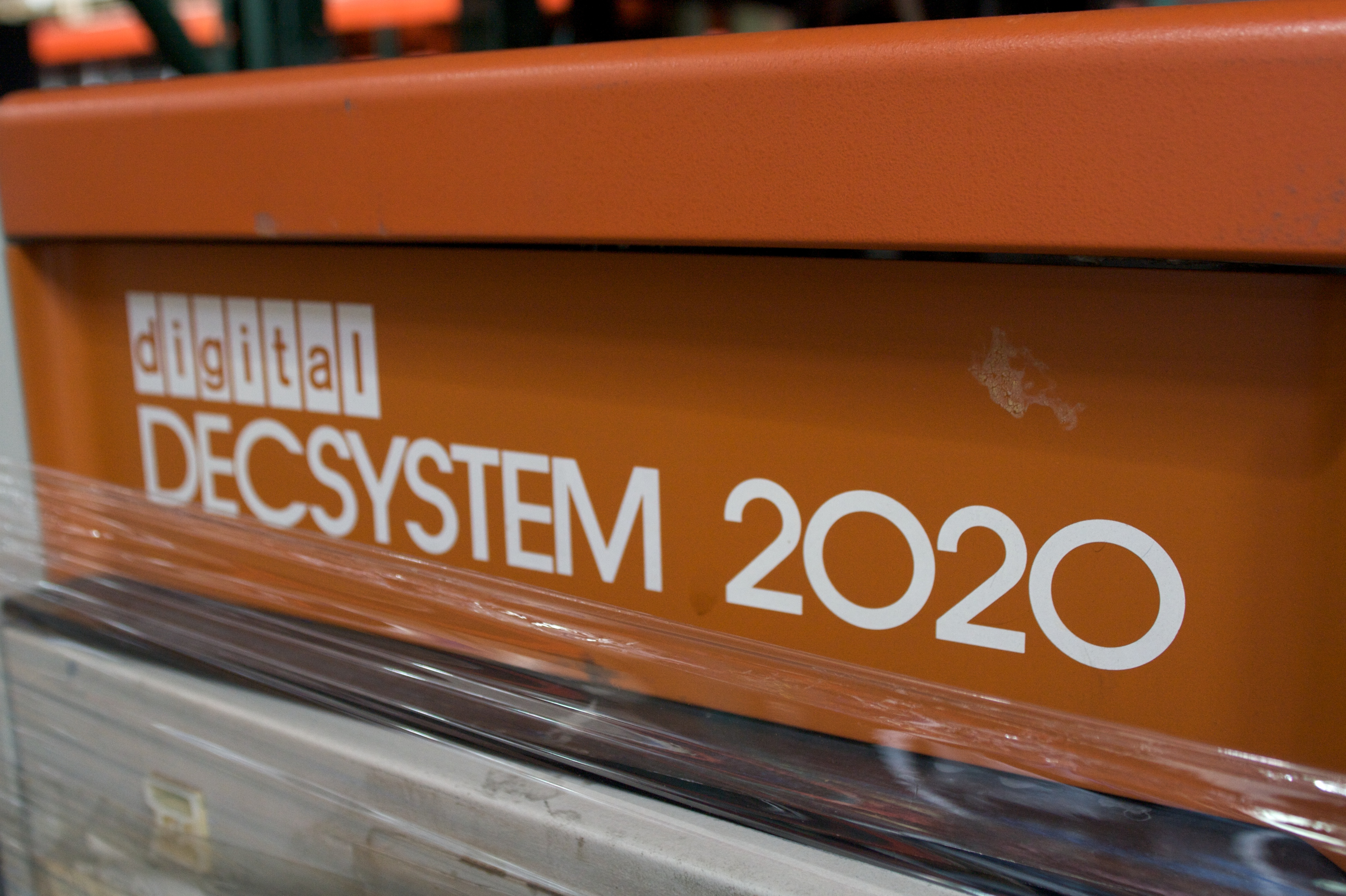
DECSYSTEM-2020 front panel

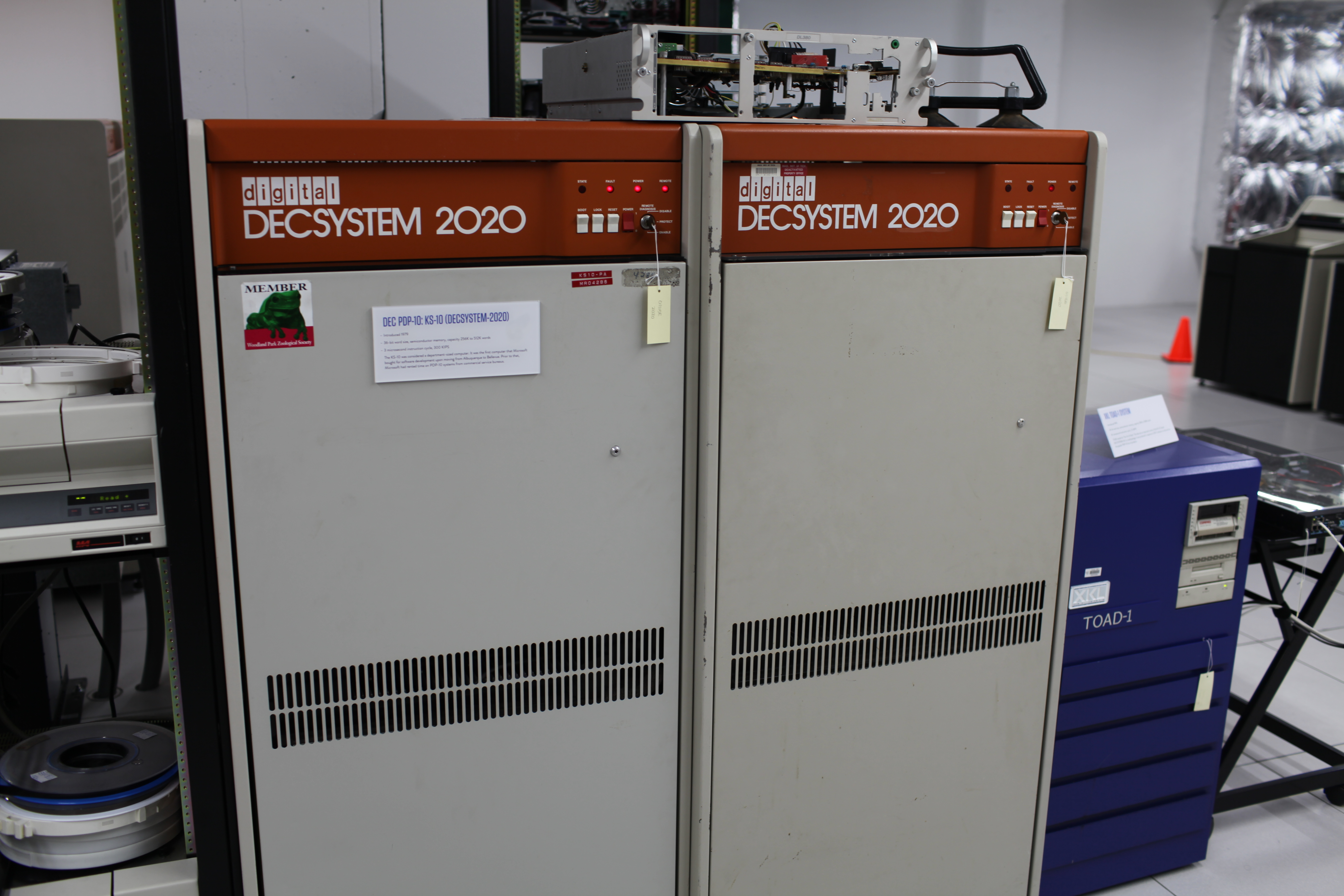
2 DECSYSTEM-2020 KS-10s (1979) at the Living Computer Museum

The DECSYSTEM-20 was a family of 36-bit Digital Equipment Corporation PDP-10 mainframe computers running the TOPS-20 operating system and was introduced in 1977.

PDP-10 computers running the TOPS-10 operating system were labeled DECsystem-10 as a way of differentiating them from the PDP-11. Later on, those systems running TOPS-20 (on the KL10 PDP-10 processors) were labeled DECSYSTEM-20 (the block capitals being the result of a lawsuit brought against DEC by Singer, which made its own System Ten model, occasionally referenced in reporting as the "System 10"). The DECSYSTEM-20 was sometimes called PDP-20, although this designation was never used by DEC.

== Models ==
The following models were produced:

- DECSYSTEM-2020: KS10 bit-slice processor with up to 512 kilowords of solid state RAM (The ADP OnSite version of the DECSYSTEM-2020 supported 1 MW of RAM)
- DECSYSTEM-2040: KL10 ECL processor with up to 1024 kilowords of magnetic core RAM
- DECSYSTEM-2050: KL10 ECL processor with 2k words of cache and up to 1024 kilowords of RAM
- DECSYSTEM-2060: KL10 ECL processor with 2k words of cache and up to 4096 kilowords of solid state memory
- DECSYSTEM-2065: DECSYSTEM-2060 with MCA25 pager (double-sized (1024 entry) two-way associative hardware page table)

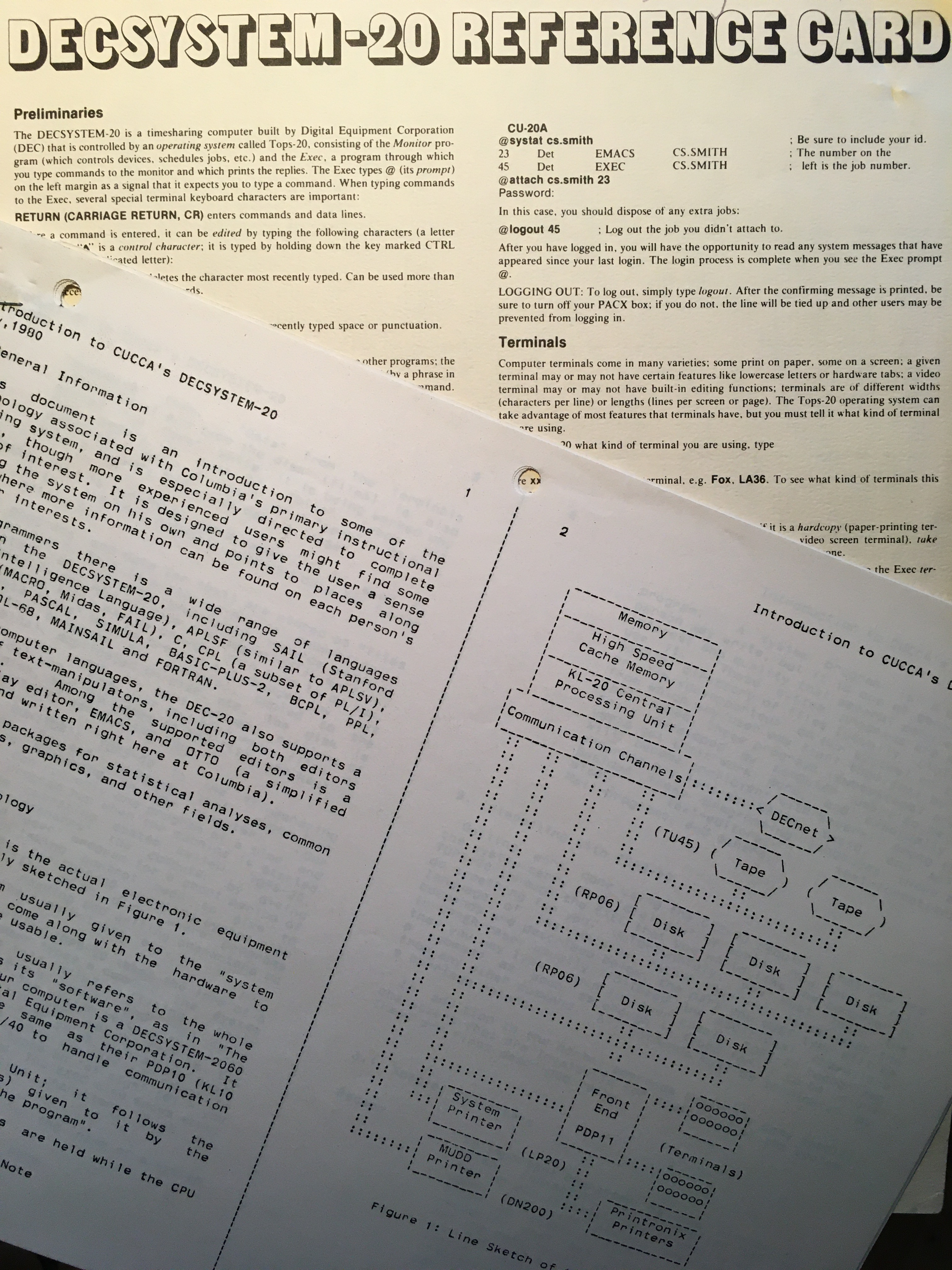
Introduction and Reference Card for the DECSYSTEM-20 at Columbia University, 1980. The DECSYSTEM-20 was the mainstay of computing at Columbia from 1977 through 1988.

The only significant difference the user could see between a DECsystem-10 and a DECSYSTEM-20 was the operating system and the color of the paint. Most (but not all) machines sold to run TOPS-10 were painted "Blasi Blue", whereas most TOPS-20 machines were painted "Terracotta" (often mistakenly called "Chinese Red" or orange; the actual name of the color on the paint cans was Terra Cotta).

There were some significant internal differences between the earlier KL10 Model A processors, used in the earlier DECsystem-10s running on KL10 processors, and the later KL10 Model Bs, used for the DECSYSTEM-20s. Model As used the original PDP-10 memory bus, with external memory modules. The later Model B processors used in the DECSYSTEM-20 used internal memory, mounted in the same cabinet as the CPU. The Model As also had different packaging; they came in the original tall PDP-10 cabinets, rather than the short ones used later on for the DECSYSTEM-20.

The last released implementation of DEC's 36-bit architecture was the single cabinet DECSYSTEM-2020, using a KS10 processor.

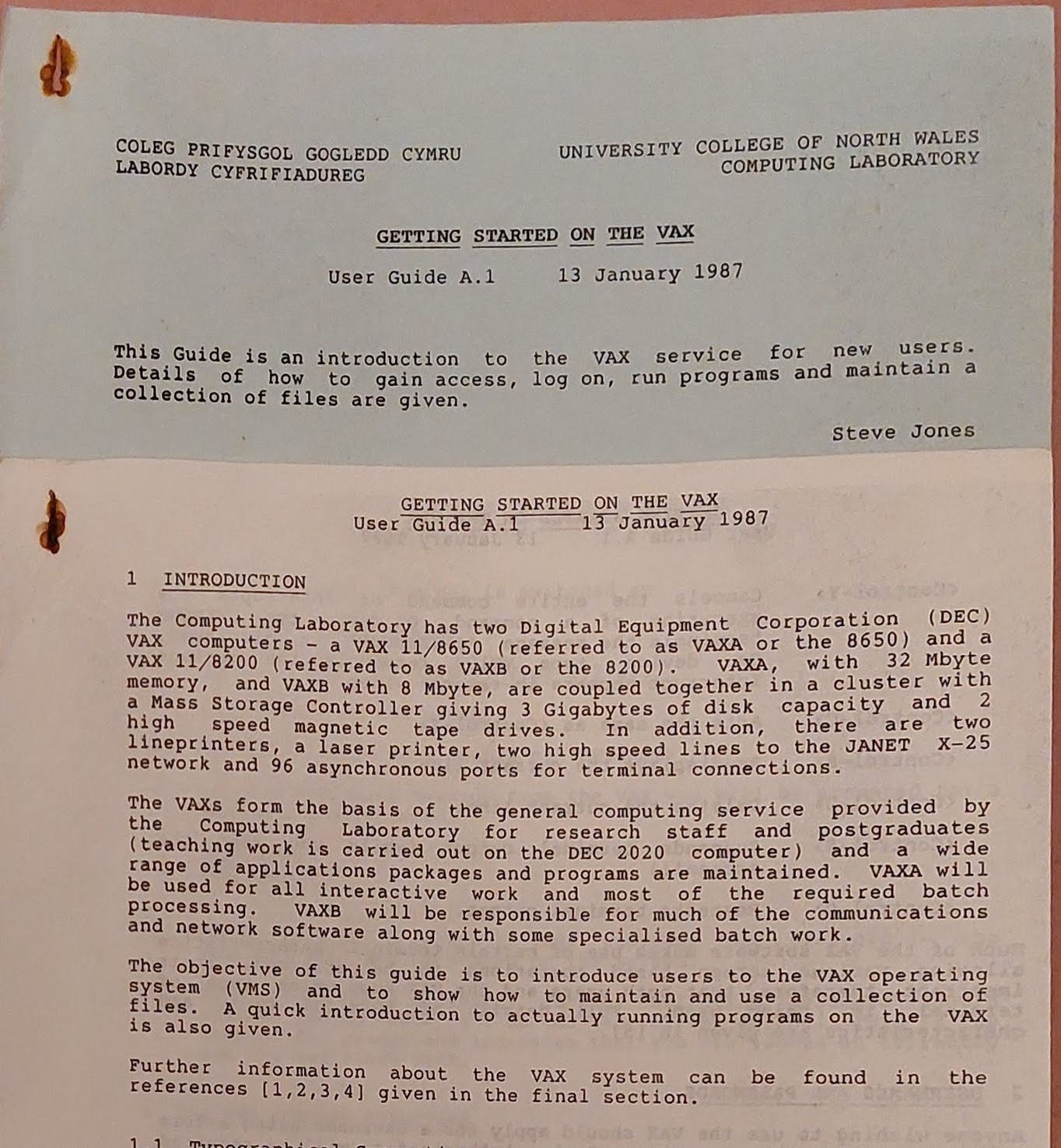
University College of North Wales 1987 "..teaching work is carried out on the DEC 2020.."

The DECSYSTEM-20 was primarily designed and used as a small mainframe for timesharing. That is, multiple users would concurrently log on to individual user accounts and share use of the main processor to compile and run applications. Separate disk allocations were maintained for all users by the operating system, and various levels of protection could be maintained by for System, Owner, Group, and World users. A model 2060, for example, could typically host up to 40 to 60 simultaneous users before exhibiting noticeably delayed response time.

== Remaining machines ==
The Living Computer Museum of Seattle, Washington, maintained a 2065 running TOPS-10, which was available to interested parties via SSH upon registration (at no cost) at their website.
