= Teletype (disambiguation) =

The teletype, or teleprinter, is a device used for communicating text over telegraph lines, public switched telephone network, Telex, radio, or satellite links.

Teletype may also refer to:

== Devices ==
- Teletype Model 28, a 1951 model of teleprinter
- Teletype Model 33, a 1963 model of teleprinter
- Telecommunications device for the deaf or TDD, a teleprinter specifically designed for text communication over the public switched telephone network

== Companies ==
- TeleType Co., an American GPS software company
- Teletype Corporation, a subsidiary of the Western Electric Company, purchased by the American Telephone and Telegraph Company in 1930
