= Clutch =

Mechanical connector for rotating parts

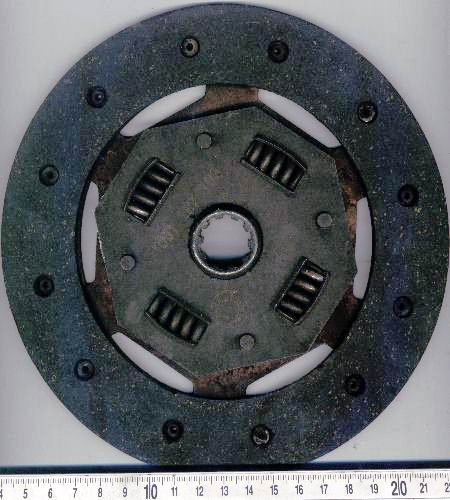
Friction disk for a dry clutch

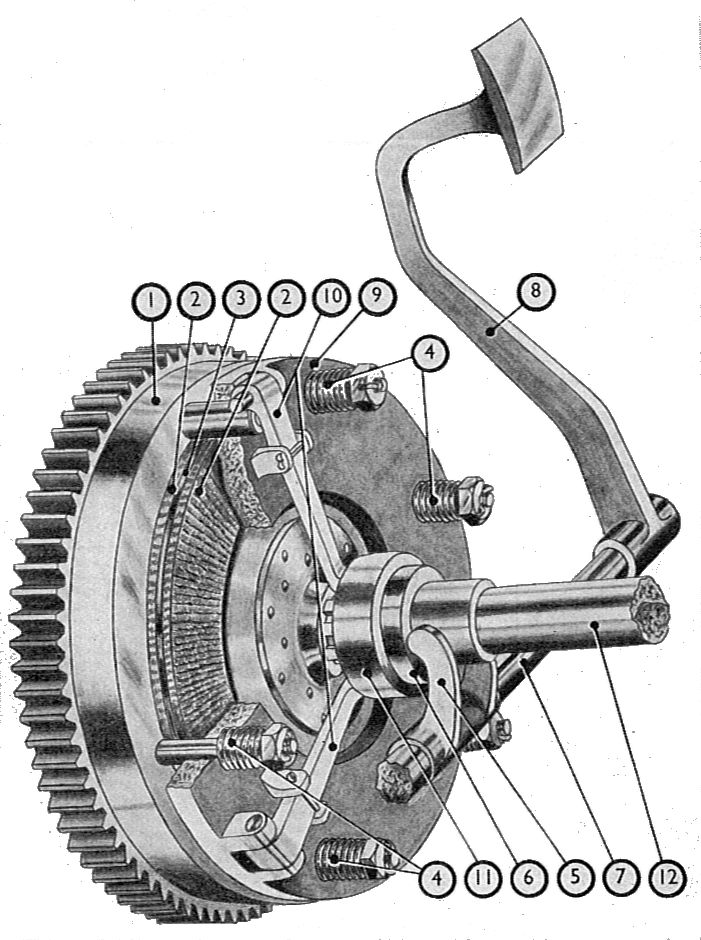
Plate clutch

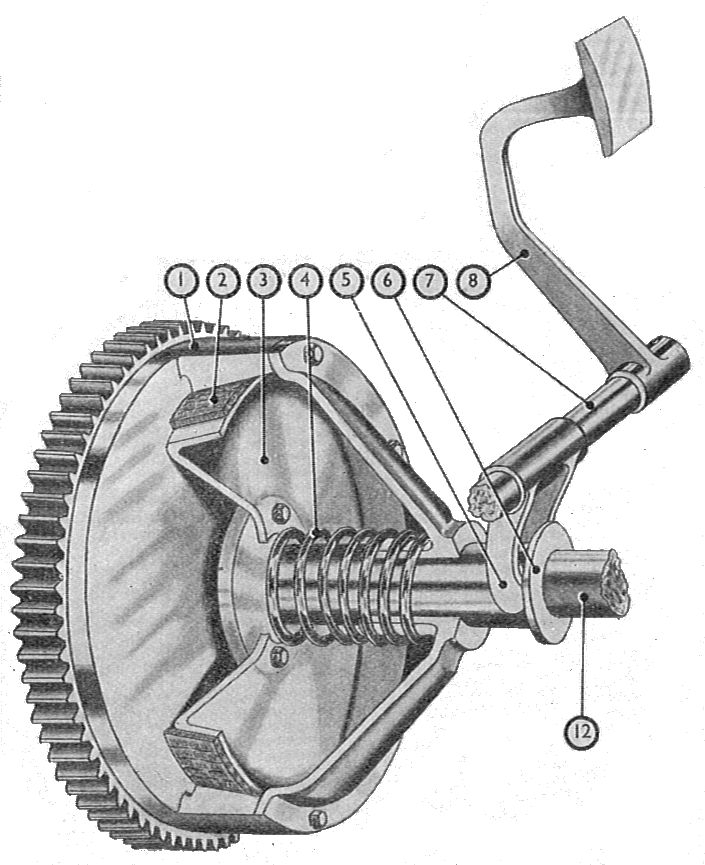
Cone clutch

A clutch is a mechanical device that allows an output shaft to be disconnected from a rotating input shaft. The clutch's input shaft is typically attached to a motor, while the clutch's output shaft is connected to the mechanism that does the work.

In a motor vehicle, the clutch acts as a mechanical linkage between the engine and transmission. By disengaging the clutch, the engine speed (RPM) is no longer determined by the speed of the driven wheels.

Another example of clutch usage is in electric drills. The clutch's input shaft is driven by a motor and the output shaft is connected to the drill bit (via several intermediate components). The clutch allows the drill bit to either spin at the same speed as the motor (clutch engaged), spin at a lower speed than the motor (clutch slipping) or remain stationary while the motor is spinning (clutch disengaged).

== Types ==
=== Dry clutch ===
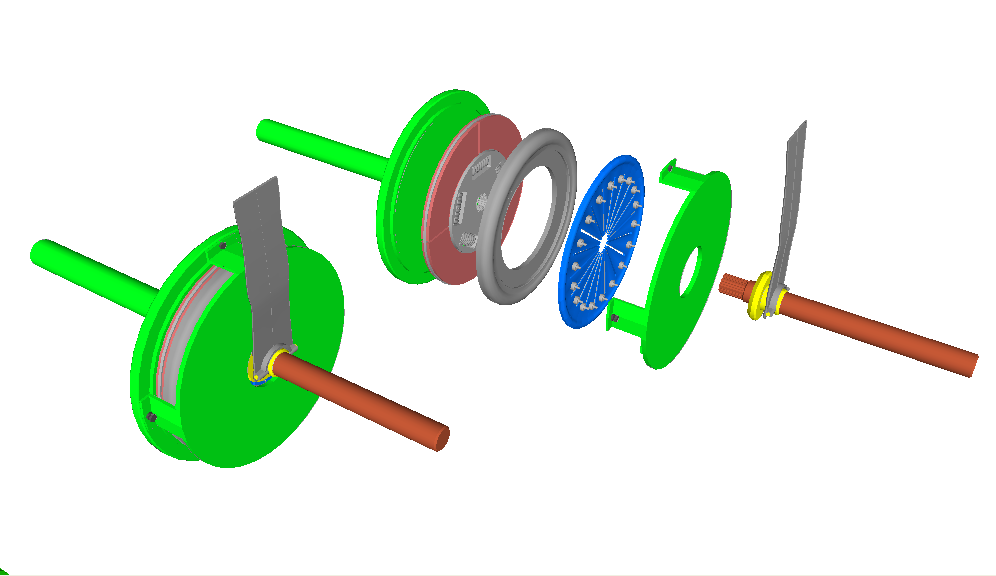
Diagram of a dry clutch

A dry clutch uses dry friction to transfer power from the input shaft to the output shaft, for example a friction disk presses against a car engine's flywheel by a spring mechanism. The wheels of the vehicle are only powered when the flywheel is in contact with the friction disk. To stop the transfer of power, the friction disk is moved away from the flywheel by means of a lever mechanism. The majority of automotive clutches on manual transmissions are dry clutches. Slippage of a friction clutch (where the clutch is partially engaged but the shafts are rotating at different speeds) is sometimes required, such as when a motor vehicle accelerates from a standstill; however, the slippage should be minimised to avoid increased wear rates.

In a pull-type clutch, pressing the pedal pulls the release bearing to disengage the clutch. In a push-type clutch, pressing the pedal pushes the release bearing to disengage the clutch.

A multi-plate clutch consists of several friction plates arranged concentrically. In some cases, it is used instead of a larger diameter clutch. Drag racing cars use multi-plate clutches to control the rate of power transfer to the wheels as the vehicle accelerates from a standing start.

Some clutch disks include springs designed to change the natural frequency of the clutch disc, in order to reduce NVH within the vehicle. Also, some clutches for manual transmission cars use a clutch delay valve to avoid abrupt engagements of the clutch.

=== Wet clutch ===
In a wet clutch, the friction material sits in an oil bath (or has flow-through oil) which cools and lubricates the clutch. This can provide smoother engagement and a longer lifespan of the clutch; however, wet clutches can have a lower efficiency due to some energy being transferred to the oil. Since the surfaces of a wet clutch can be slippery (as with a motorcycle clutch bathed in engine oil), stacking multiple clutch discs can compensate for the lower coefficient of friction and so eliminate slippage under power when fully engaged.

Wet clutches often use a composite paper material.

=== Centrifugal clutch ===
A centrifugal clutch automatically engages as the speed of the input shaft increases and disengages as the input shaft speed decreases. Applications include small motorcycles, motor scooters, chainsaws, and some older automobiles.

=== Cone clutch ===
A cone clutch is similar to dry friction plate clutch, except the friction material is applied to the outside of a conical shaped object. This conical shape allows wedging action to occur during engagement. A common application for cone clutches is the synchronizer ring in a manual transmission.

=== Dog clutch ===
A dog clutch is a non-slip design of clutch which is used in non-synchronous transmissions.

=== Single-revolution clutch ===
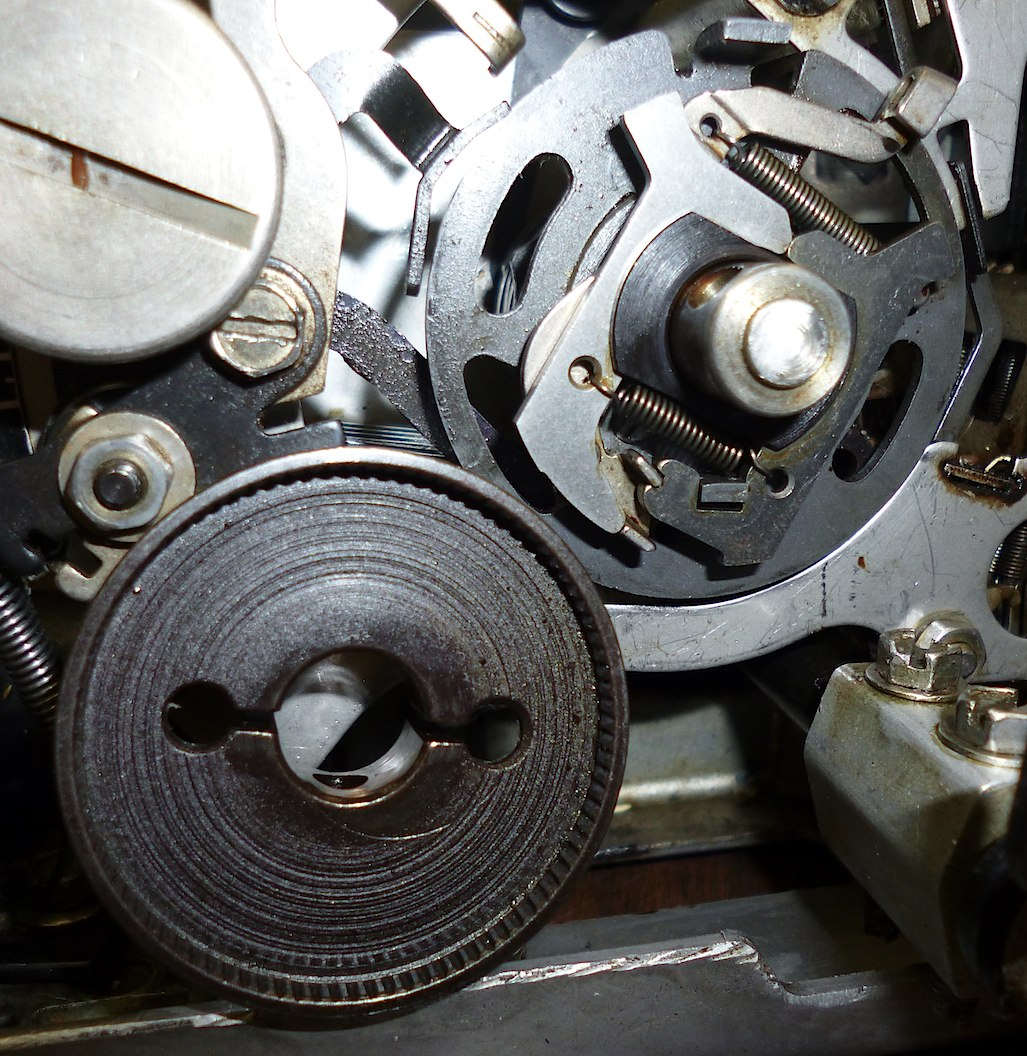
Cascaded-pawl single-revolution clutch in a teleprinter

The single-revolution clutch was developed in the 19th century to power machinery such as shears or presses where a single pull of the operating lever or (later) press of a button would trip the mechanism, engaging the clutch between the power source and the machine's crankshaft for exactly one revolution before disengaging the clutch. When the clutch is disengaged, the driven member is stationary. Early designs were typically dog clutches with a cam on the driven member used to disengage the dogs at the appropriate point.

Greatly simplified single-revolution clutches were developed in the 20th century, requiring much smaller operating forces and in some variations, allowing for a fixed fraction of a revolution per operation. Fast action friction clutches replaced dog clutches in some applications, eliminating the problem of impact loading on the dogs every time the clutch engaged.

In addition to their use in heavy manufacturing equipment, single-revolution clutches were applied to numerous small machines. In tabulating machines, for example, pressing the operate key would trip a single revolution clutch to process the most recently entered number. In typesetting machines, pressing any key selected a particular character and also engaged a single rotation clutch to cycle the mechanism to typeset that character. Similarly, in teleprinters, the receipt of each character tripped a single-revolution clutch to operate one cycle of the print mechanism.

In 1928, Frederick G. Creed developed a single-turn wrap spring clutch that was particularly well suited to the repetitive start-stop action required in teleprinters. In 1942, two employees of Pitney Bowes Postage Meter Company developed an improved single turn spring clutch. In these clutches, a coil spring is wrapped around the driven shaft and held in an expanded configuration by the trip lever. When tripped, the spring rapidly contracts around the power shaft engaging the clutch. At the end of one revolution, if the trip lever has been reset, it catches the end of the spring (or a pawl attached to it), and the angular momentum of the driven member releases the tension on the spring. These clutches have long operating lives—many have performed tens and perhaps hundreds of millions of cycles without the need of maintenance other than occasional lubrication.

Cascaded-pawl single-revolution clutches superseded wrap-spring single-revolution clutches in page printers, such as teleprinters, including the Teletype Model 28 and its successors, using the same design principles. IBM Selectric typewriters also used them. These are typically disc-shaped assemblies mounted on the driven shaft. Inside the hollow disc-shaped drive drum are two or three freely floating pawls arranged so that when the clutch is tripped, the pawls spring outward much like the shoes in a drum brake. When engaged, the load torque on each pawl transfers to the others to keep them engaged. These clutches do not slip once locked up, and they engage very quickly, on the order of milliseconds. A trip projection extends out from the assembly. If the trip lever engaged this projection, the clutch was disengaged. When the trip lever releases this projection, internal springs and friction engage the clutch. The clutch then rotates one or more turns, stopping when the trip lever again engages the trip projection.

=== Other designs ===
- Kickback clutch-brakes: Found in some types of synchronous-motor-driven electric clocks built before the 1940s, to prevent the clock from running backwards. The clutch consisted of a wrap-spring clutch-brake that was coupled to the rotor by one or two stages of reduction gearing. The clutch-brake locked up when rotated backwards, but also had some spring action. The inertia of the rotor going backwards engaged the clutch and wound the spring. As it unwound, it restarted the motor in the correct direction.
- Belt clutch: used on agricultural equipment, lawnmowers, tillers, and snow blowers. Engine power is transmitted via a set of belts that are slack when the engine is idling, but an idler pulley can tighten the belts to increase friction between the belts and the pulleys.
- BMA clutch: Invented by Waldo J Kelleigh in 1949, used for transmitting torque between two shafts consisting of a fixed driving member secured to one of said shafts, and a movable driving member, having a contacting surface with a plurality of indentations.
- Electromagnetic clutch: typically engaged by an electromagnet that is an integral part of the clutch assembly. Another type, the magnetic particle clutch, contains magnetically influenced particles in a chamber between driving and driven members—application of direct current makes the particles clump together and adhere to the operating surfaces. Engagement and slippage are notably smooth.
- Wrap-spring clutch: has a helical spring, typically wound with square-cross-section wire. These were developed in the late 19th and early 20th-century. In simple form the spring is fastened at one end to the driven member; its other end is unattached. The spring fits closely around a cylindrical driving member. If the driving member rotates in the direction that would unwind the spring expands minutely and slips although with some drag. Because of this, spring clutches must typically be lubricated with light oil. Rotating the driving member the other way makes the spring wrap itself tightly around the driving surface and the clutch locks up very quickly. The torque required to make a spring clutch slip grows exponentially with the number of turns in the spring, obeying the capstan equation.

== Usage in automobiles ==
=== Manual transmissions ===
Most cars and trucks with a manual transmission use a dry clutch, which is operated by the driver using the left-most pedal. The motion of the pedal is transferred to the clutch using mechanical linkage, hydraulics (master and slave cylinders) or a cable. The clutch is only disengaged at times when the driver is pressing on the clutch pedal, therefore the default state is for the transmission to be connected to the engine. A "neutral" gear position is provided, so that the clutch pedal can be released with the vehicle remaining stationary.

The clutch is required for standing starts and in vehicles whose transmissions lack synchronising means to assist in matching the speeds of the engine and transmission during gear changes to avoid gear “crashing,” which can cause serious damage to gear teeth.

The clutch is usually mounted directly to the face of the engine's flywheel, as this already provides a convenient large-diameter steel disk that can act as one driving plate of the clutch. Some racing clutches use small multi-plate disk packs that are not part of the flywheel. Both clutch and flywheel are enclosed in a conical bellhousing for the gearbox. The friction material used for the clutch disk varies, with a common material being an organic compound resin with a copper wire facing or a ceramic material.

=== Automatic transmissions ===
In an automatic transmission, the role of the clutch is performed by a torque converter. However, the transmission itself often includes internal clutches, such as a lock-up clutch to prevent slippage of the torque converter, in order to reduce the energy loss through the transmission and therefore improve fuel economy.

=== Fans and compressors ===
Older belt-driven engine cooling fans often use a heat-activated clutch, in the form of a bimetallic strip. When the temperature is low, the spring winds and closes the valve, which lets the fan spin at about 20% to 30% of the crankshaft speed. As the temperature of the spring rises, it unwinds and opens the valve, allowing fluid past the valve, making the fan spin at about 60% to 90% of crankshaft speed.

A vehicle's air-conditioning compressor often uses magnetic clutches to engage the compressor as required.

== Usage in motorcycles ==
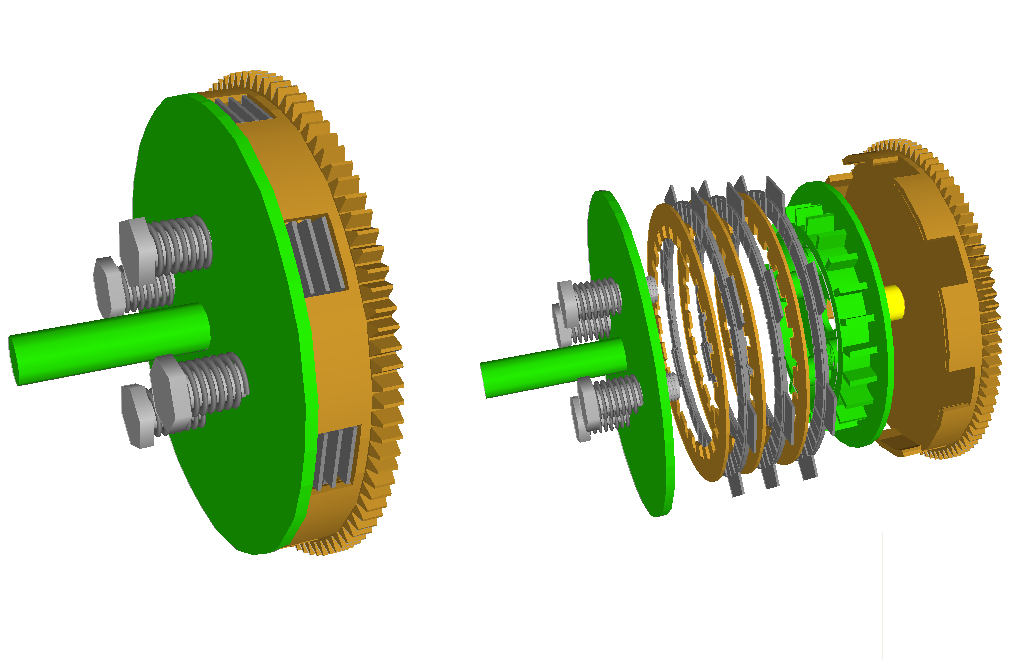
A basket clutch

Motorcycles typically employ a wet clutch with the clutch riding in the same oil as the transmission. These clutches are usually made up of a stack of alternating friction plates and steel plates. The friction plates have lugs on their outer diameters that lock them into a basket that is turned by the crankshaft. The steel plates have lugs on their inner diameters that lock them to the transmission input shaft. A set of coil springs or a diaphragm spring plate force the plates together when the clutch is engaged.

On motorcycles the clutch is operated by a hand lever on the left handlebar. No pressure on the lever means that the clutch plates are engaged (driving), while pulling the lever back towards the rider disengages the clutch plates through cable or hydraulic actuation, allowing the rider to shift gears or coast. Racing motorcycles often use slipper clutches to eliminate the effects of engine braking, which, being applied only to the rear wheel, can cause instability.

== See also ==
- Clutch control
- Coupling
- Freewheel
- Gear shift
- Saxomat
- Torque converter
- Torque limiter
