= Clutch delay valve =

Automotive component

A clutch delay valve is an automotive component added to the clutch system of an automobile to control clutch engagement speed. Its purpose is to engage the drivetrain of an automobile without introducing shock to the drivetrain components by engaging too quickly. By preventing drivetrain shock, clutch delay valves also prevent an automobile's balance from being upset, which aids in handling characteristics.

== Applications ==
Clutch delay valves operate on the principle that engagement only needs to occur at a certain rate to be efficient, and that engaging the clutch too quickly can cause damage to parts such as the transmission, differential, half shafts, axles, and CV joints. Engaging the drive train too slowly, meanwhile, can damage the clutch friction disc and cause clutch slippage. Clutch delay valves operate as one-way restrictor valves that limit the volume of fluid that can move through the lines in a given time. This ensures quick and firm engagement without being too fast for the drivetrain to handle, while also allowing the clutch to quickly disengage.

BMW has used clutch delay valves on the E39 and E46 models, and others, from 1997. These valves have been unpopular with some drivers and are sometimes removed in favour of a conventional clutch action. The BMW valve takes the form of a separate pipe fitting and is easily removed. Honda has also used clutch delay valves on some Civic models, which are integral to the clutch slave cylinder and must be dismantled in situ.

== See also ==
- Clutch
- Drivetrain
- Manual transmission
- Constant-velocity joint
- Differential (mechanical device)
- Weight transfer
- Clutch brake
