= Teletype Model 33 =

1963–1981 ASCII communications/computer terminal device

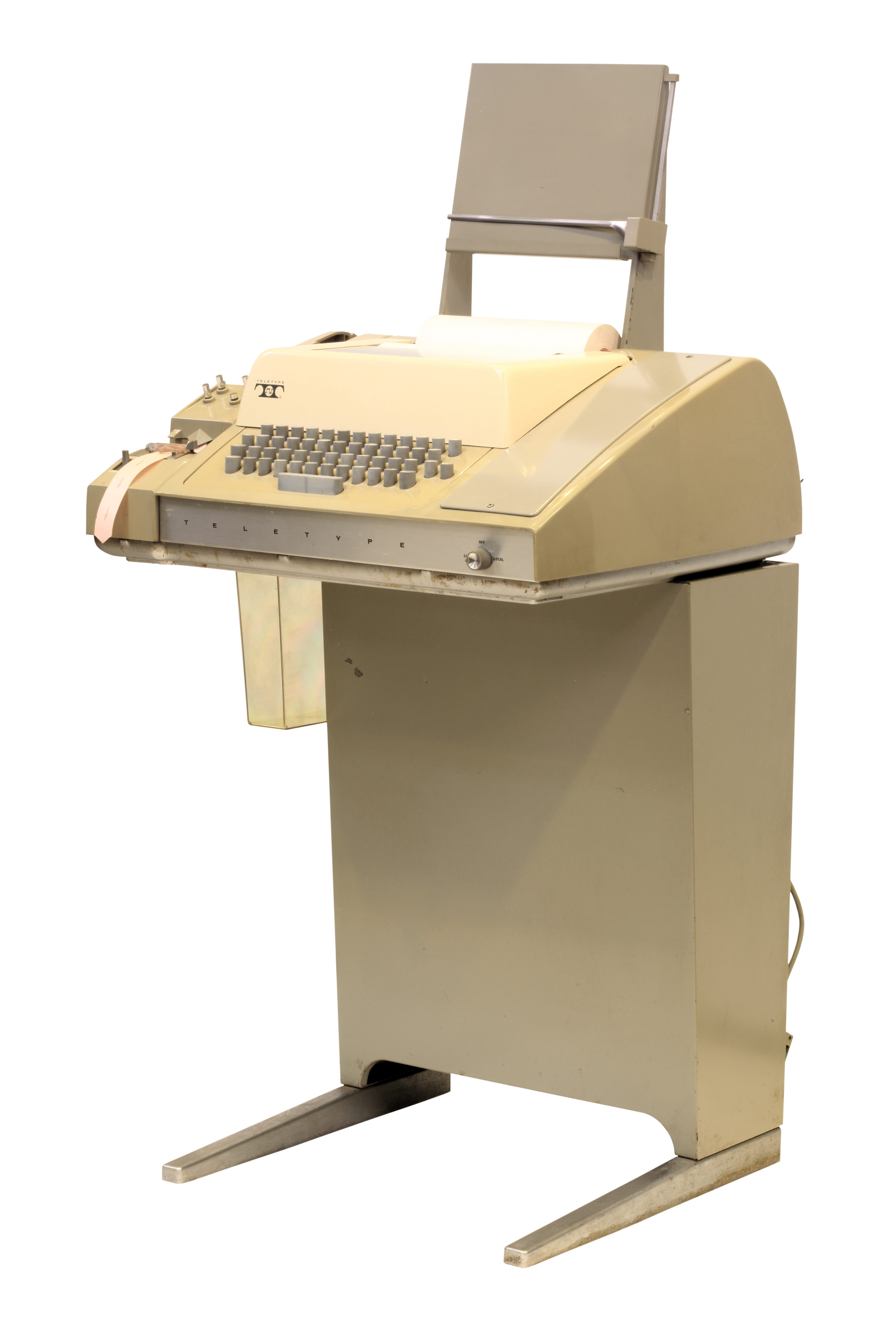
Teletype Model 33 ASR teleprinter, with punched tape reader and punch, usable as a computer terminal

The Teletype Model 33 is an electromechanical teleprinter designed for light-duty office use. Teletype Corporation's Model 33 terminal, introduced in 1963, was one of the most popular terminals in the data communications industry until the late 1970s. Over a half-million 33s were made by 1975, and the 500,000th was plated with gold and placed on special exhibit. Another 100,000 were made in the next 18 months, and serial number 600,000, manufactured in the United States Bicentennial, was painted red, white and blue, and shown around the country.

The Model 33 was one of the first products to employ the newly standardized ASCII character encoding method, which was first published in 1963. A companion Teletype Model 32 used the older, established five-bit Baudot code. Because of its low price and ASCII compatibility, the Model 33 was widely used, and the large quantity of teleprinters sold strongly influenced several de facto standards that developed during the 1960s.

The Model 33 originally cost about $1000 (equivalent to $11,000 today), much less than other teleprinters and computer terminals in the mid-1960s, such as the Friden Flexowriter and the IBM 1050. In 1976, a new Model 33 RO printer cost about $600 (equivalent to $3,000 today).

As Teletype Corporation realized the growing popularity of the Model 33, it began improving its most failure-prone components, gradually upgrading the original design from "light duty" to "standard duty", as promoted in its later advertising (see advertisement). The machines had good durability and faced little competition in their price class, until the appearance of Digital Equipment Corporation's DECwriter series of teleprinters.

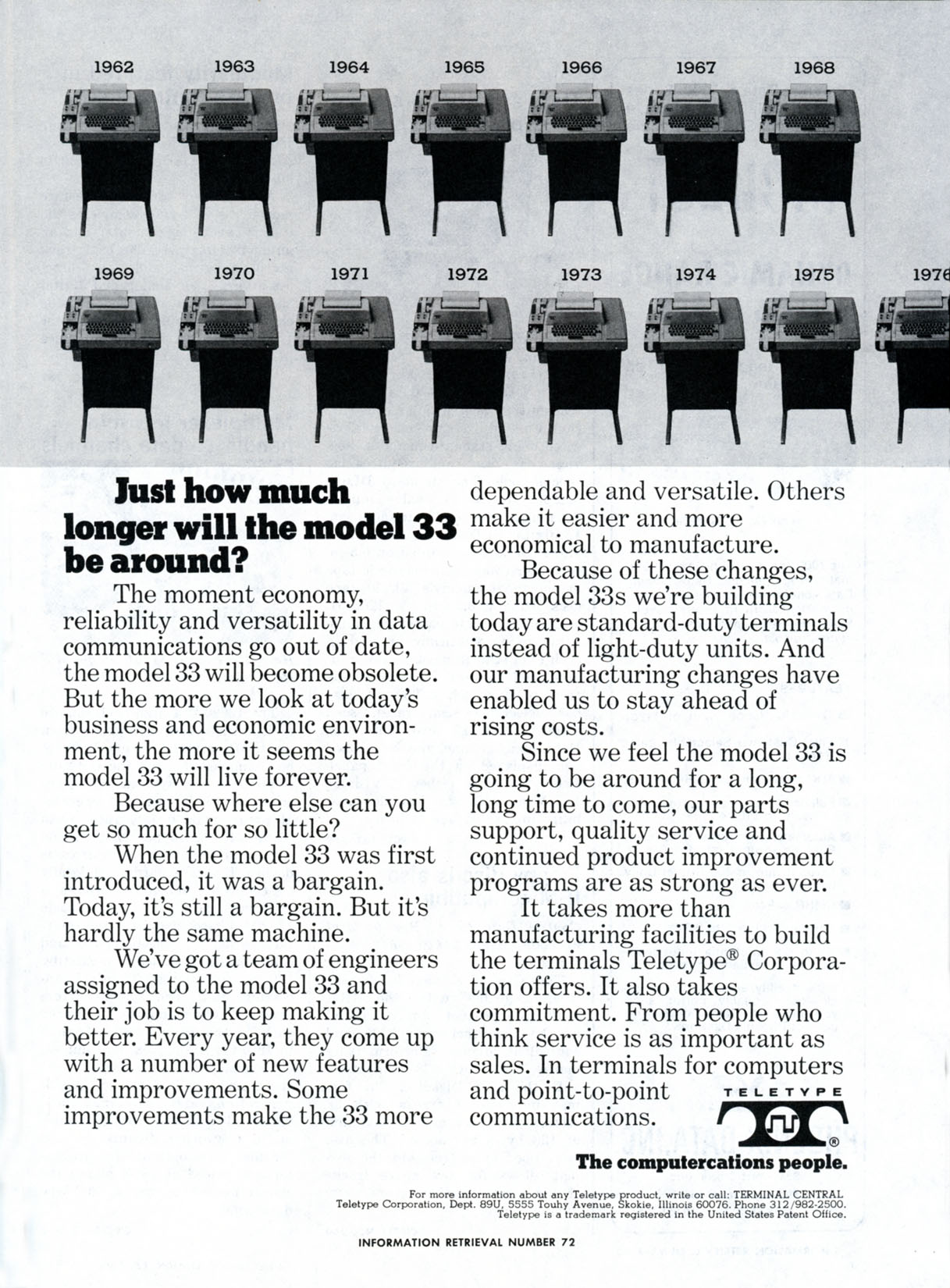
This 1974 advertisement emphasizes the widespread and longterm use of the Teletype Model 33.

It is less rugged and cost less than earlier Teletype models. The Teletype Corporation introduced the Model 33 as a commercial product in 1963, after it had originally been designed for the United States Navy. The Model 33 was produced in three versions:

- Model 33 ASR (Automatic Send and Receive), which has a built-in eight-hole punched tape reader and tape punch;
- Model 33 KSR (Keyboard Send and Receive), which lacks the paper tape reader and punch;
- Model 33 RO (Receive Only) which has neither a keyboard nor a reader/punch.
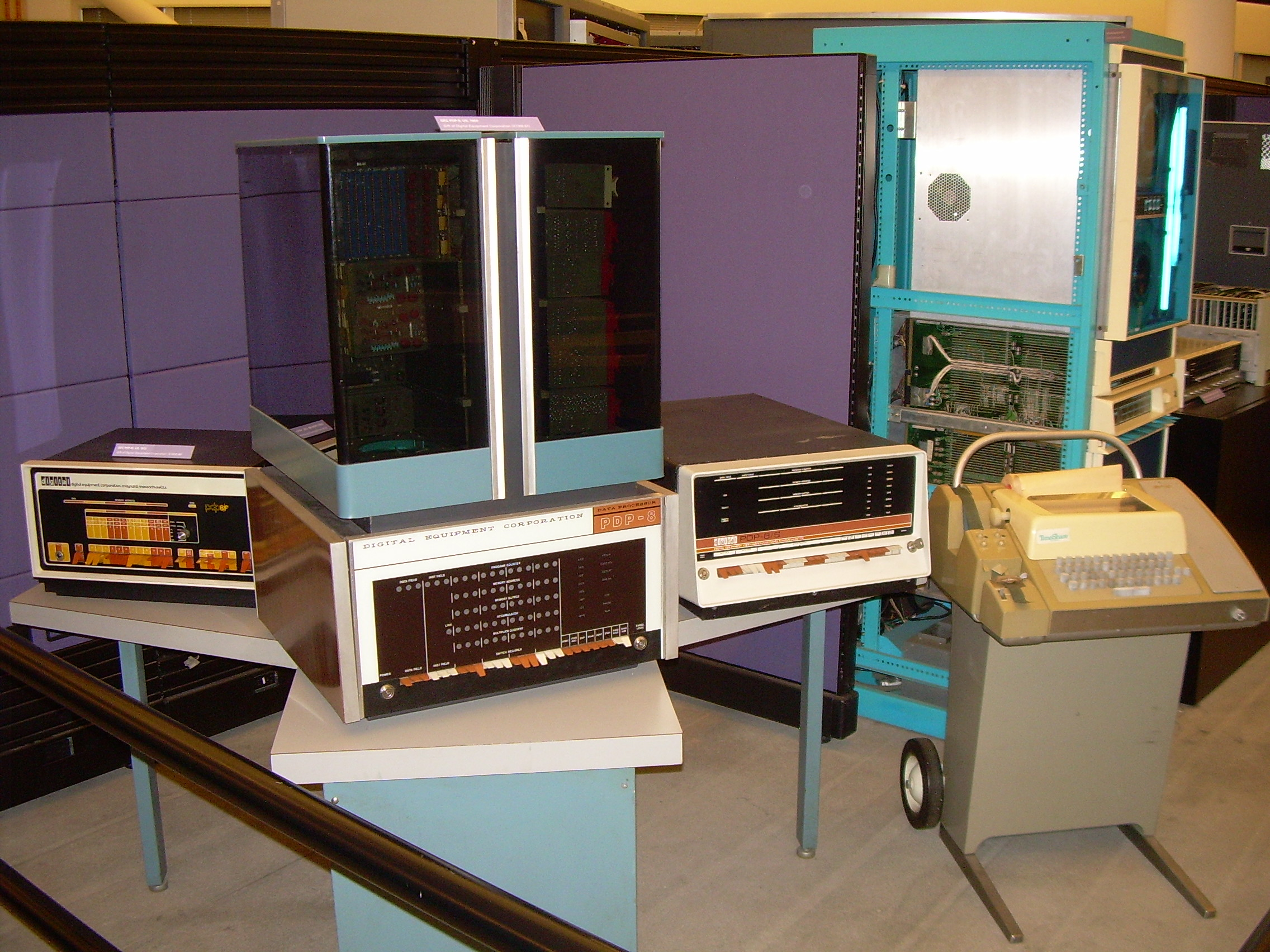
Teleprinters were standard terminals for DEC and Data General minicomputers.

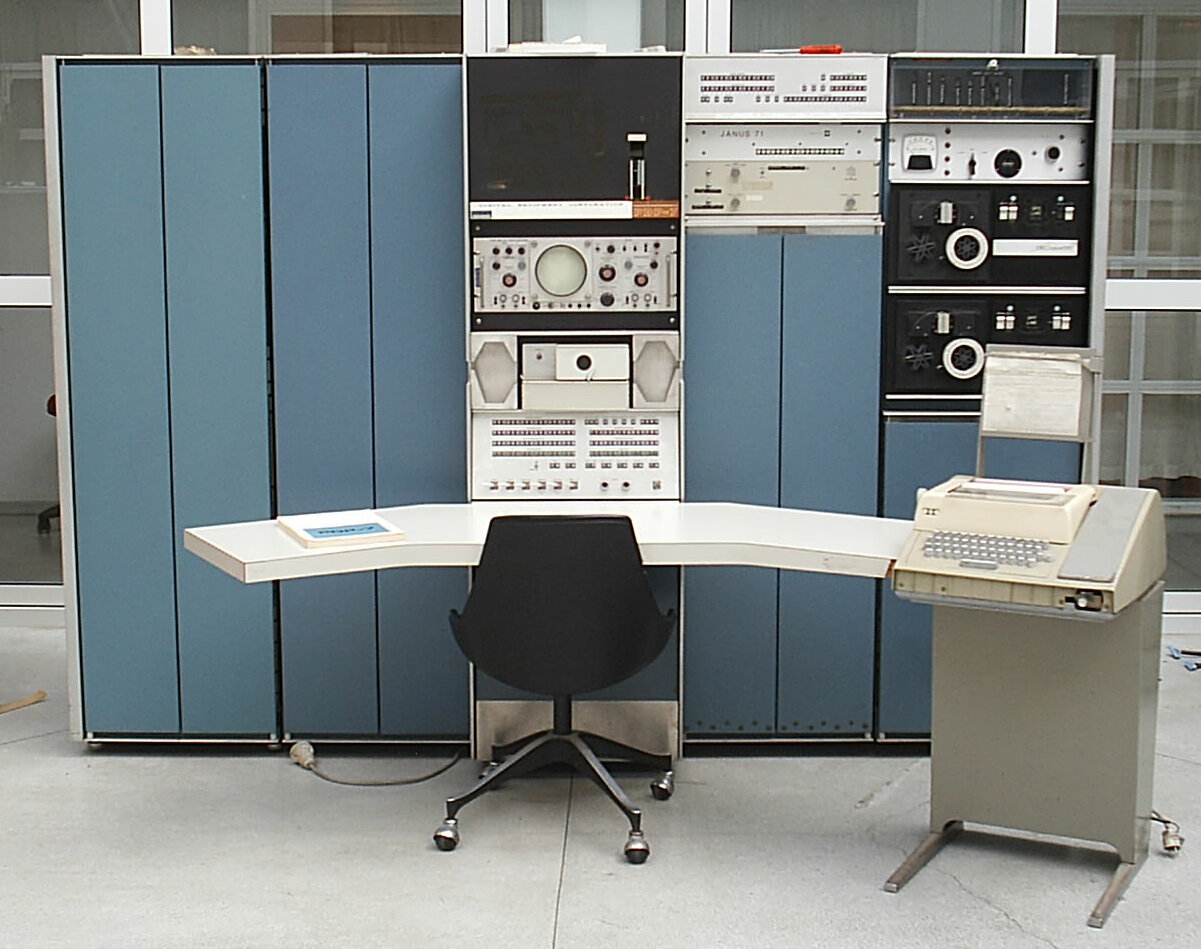
PDP-7 computer with teleprinter

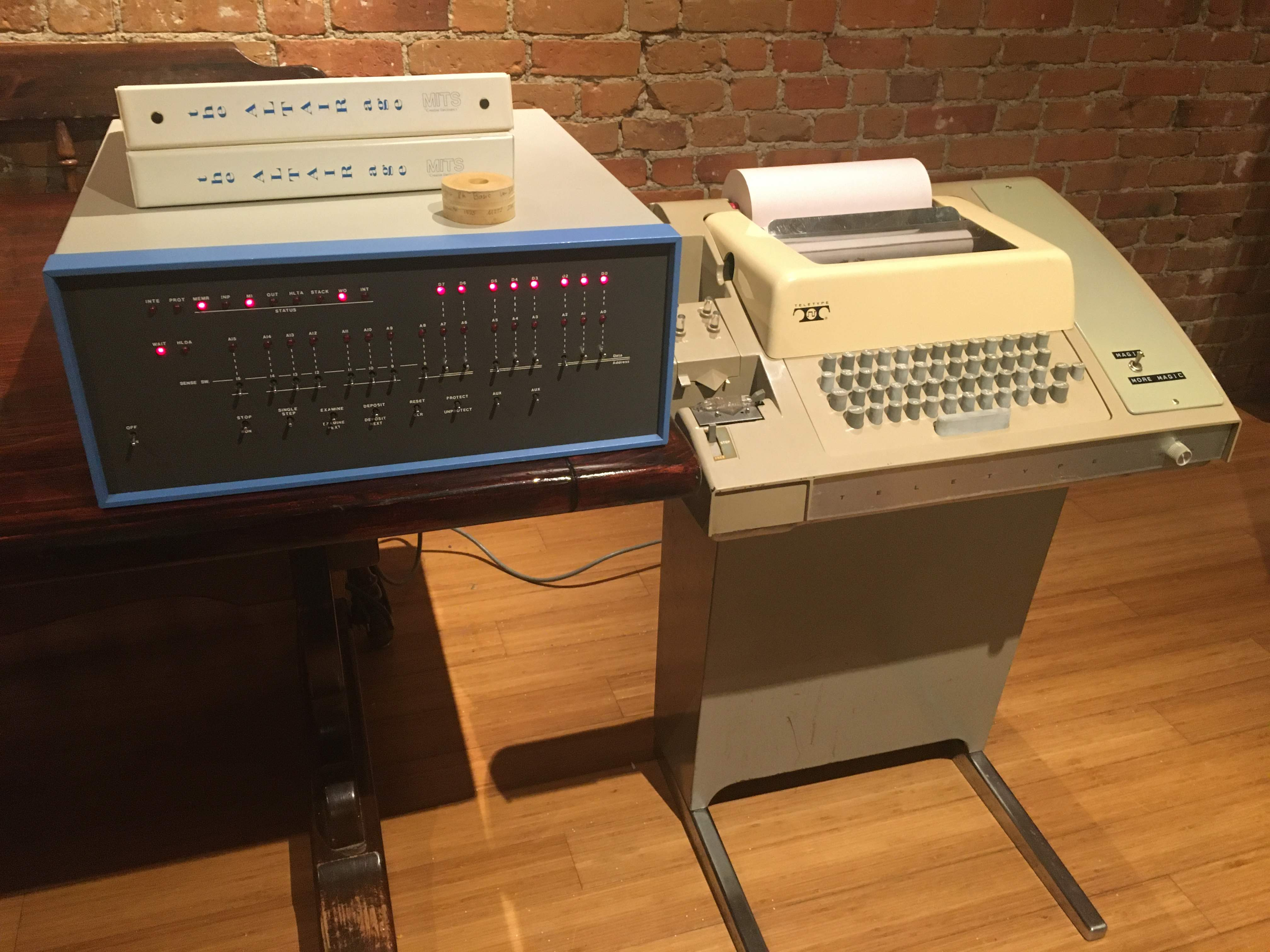
The ASR-33 was one of the most affordable terminals for early home computers.

== Naming conventions ==
While the manufacturer called the Model 33 teleprinter with a tape punch and tape reader a "Model 33 ASR", many computer users used the shorter term "ASR-33". The earliest known source for this equipment naming discrepancy comes from Digital Equipment Corporation (DEC) documentation, where the September 1963 PDP-4 brochure calls the Teletype Model 28 KSR a "KSR-28" in the paragraph titled "Printer-Keyboard and Control Type 65". This naming convention was extended from the Teletype Model 28 to other Teletype equipment in later DEC documentation, consistent with DEC's practice of designating equipment using letters followed by numerals. For example, the DEC PDP-15 price list from April 1970 lists a number of Teletype Corporation teleprinters using this alternative naming convention. This practice was widely adopted as other computer manufacturers published their documentation. For example, Micro Instrumentation and Telemetry Systems marketed the Teletype Model 33 ASR as "Teletype ASR-33".

The trigram "tty" became widely used as an informal abbreviation for "Teletype", often used to designate the main text input and output device on many early computer systems. The abbreviation remains in use by radio amateurs ("ham radio") and in the hearing-impaired community, to refer to text input and output assistive devices.

== Obsolescence ==
Early video terminals, such as the Tektronix 4010, did not become available until 1970, and initially cost around $10,000 (equivalent to $105,000 today). However, the introduction of integrated circuits and semiconductor memory later that decade allowed the price of cathode-ray tube-based terminals to rapidly fall below the price of a Teletype teleprinter.

"Dumb terminals", such as the low-cost ADM-3 (1975) began to undercut the market for Teletype terminals. Such basic video terminals, which could only sequentially display lines of text and scroll them, were often called glass Teletypes ("glass TTYs") analogous to the Teletype printers. More-advanced video terminals, such as the Digital Equipment Corporation VT52 (1975), the ADM-3A (1976), and the VT100 (1978), could communicate much faster than electromechanical printers, and could support use of a full-screen text editor program without generating large amounts of paper printouts. Teletype machines were gradually replaced in new installations by much faster dot-matrix printers and video terminals in the middle-to-late 1970s. (A malfunctioning Teletype served as a plot point in the 1971 science fiction film The Andromeda Strain).

Because of falling sales, Teletype Corporation shut down Model 33 production in 1981. Some remained in working use, as with a scientific project in Australia, in which one was connected to a phase ionosonde (to investigate the ionosphere) until 1984.

== Technical information ==
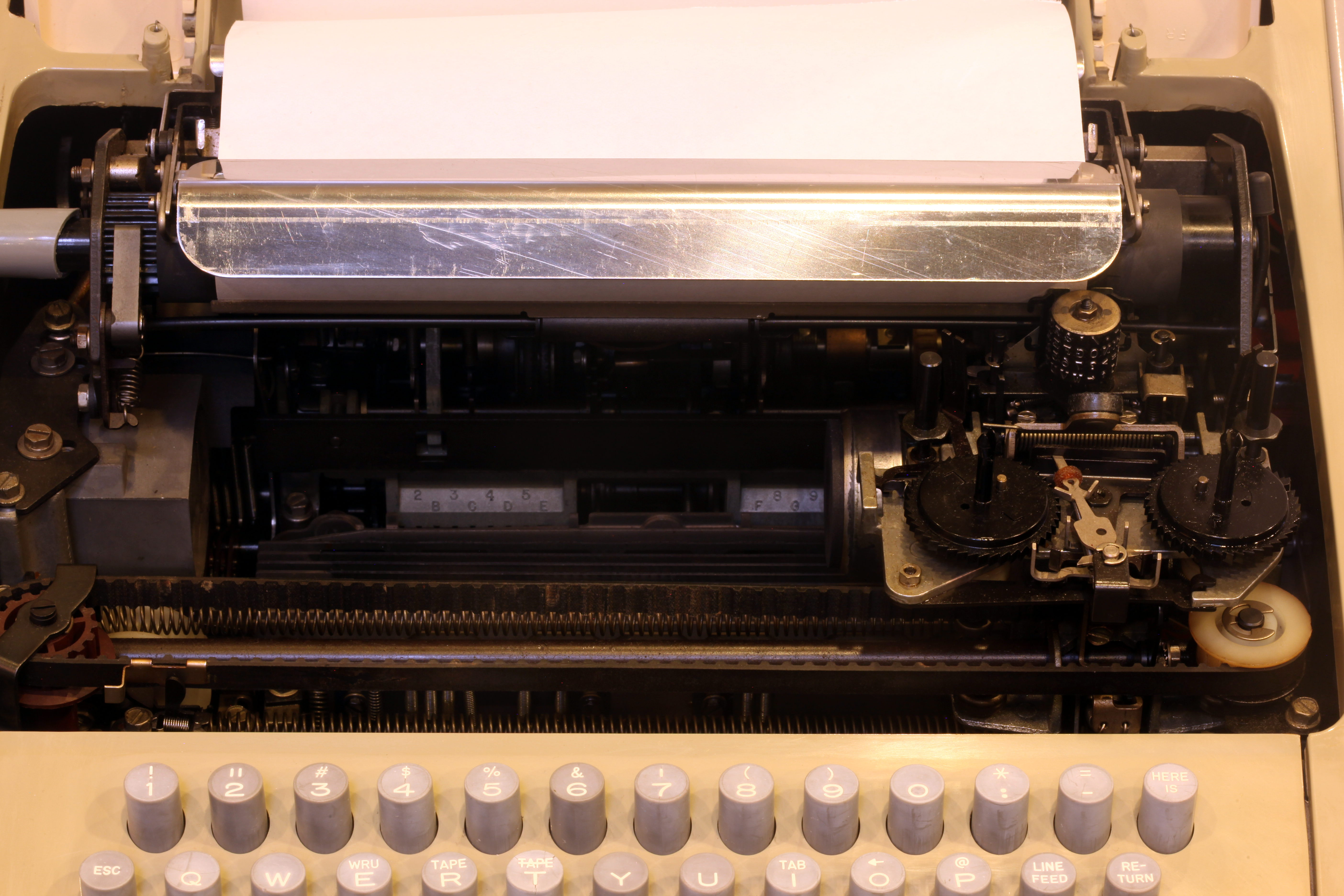
Operator's view of printing mechanism

The design objective for the Model 33 was a machine that would fit into a small office space, match with other office equipment of the time and operate up to two hours per day on average. Since this machine was designed for light duty use, adjustments that Teletype made in previous teleprinters by turning screws were made by bending metal bars and levers. Many Model 33 parts were not heat-treated and hardened. The base is die-cast metal, but self-tapping screws were used, along with parts that snapped together without bolting.

Everything is mechanically-powered by a single electric motor, located at the rear of the mechanism. The motor runs continuously as long as power is on, generating a familiar humming and slight rattle from its vibration. The noise level increases considerably whenever the printing or paper tape mechanisms are operating. Similar noises became iconic for the sounds of an active newswire or computer terminal. There is a mechanical bell, activated by code 07 (Control-G, also known as BEL), to draw special attention when needed.

The Teletype Model 33, including the stand, stands 34 inches (860 mm) high, 22 inches (560 mm) wide and 18.5 inches (470 mm) deep, not including the paper holder. The machine weighs 75 pounds (34 kg) on the stand, including paper. It requires less than 4 amperes at 115 VAC and 60 Hz. The recommended operating environment is a temperature of 40 to 110 °F (4 to 43 °C), a relative humidity of between 2 and 95 percent, and an altitude of 0 to 10,000 feet (0 to 3,048 m). The printing paper is an 8.44-by-4.5-inch (214 by 114 mm) diameter roll, and the paper tape is a 1,000-foot (300 m) roll of 1-inch (25 mm) wide tape. Nylon fabric ink ribbons are 0.5-inch (13 mm) wide by 60-yard (55 m) long, with plastic spools and eyelets to trigger automatic reversal of the ribbon feed direction.

The entire Model 33 ASR mechanism requires periodic application of grease and oil in approximately 500 locations.

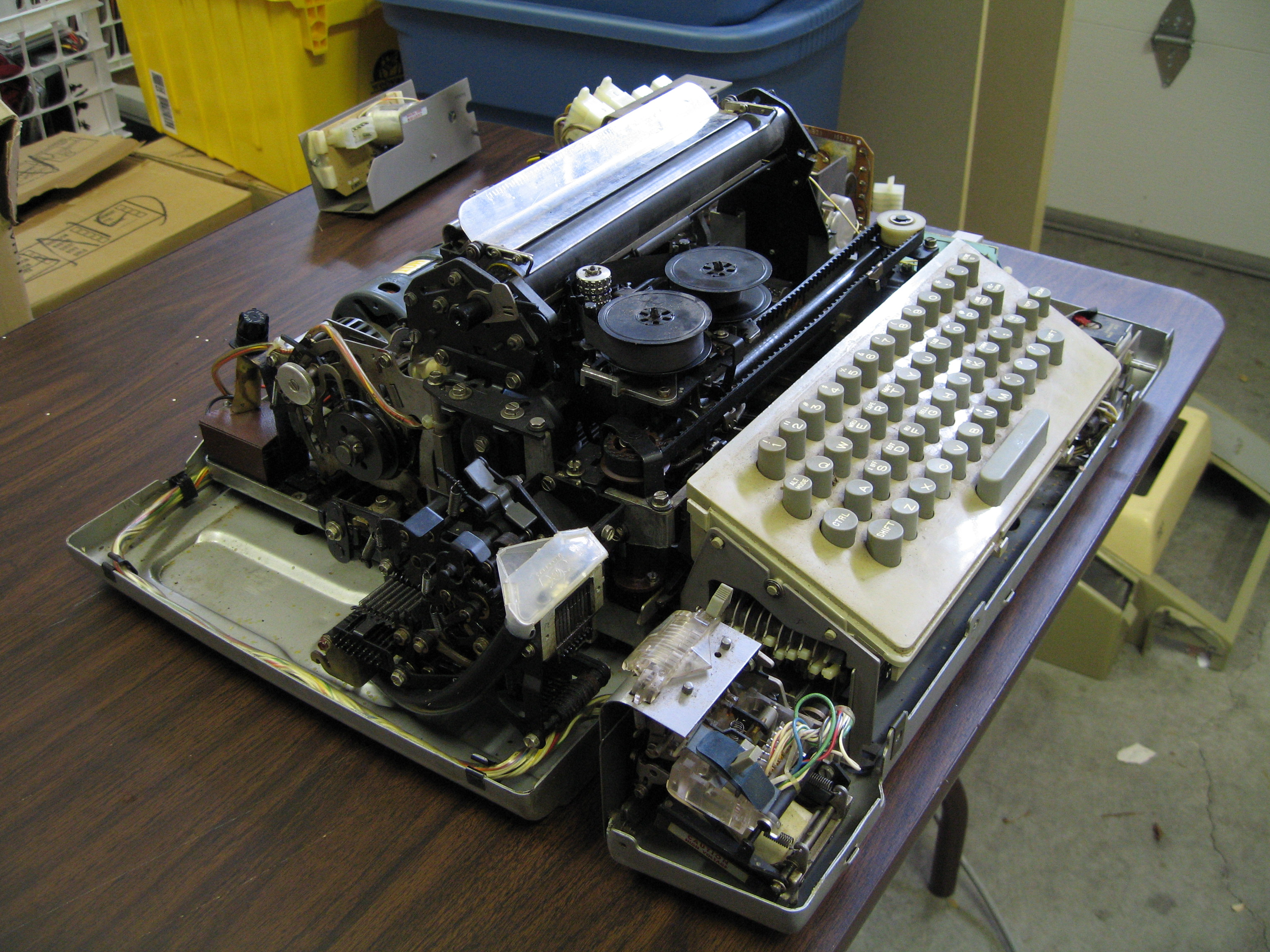
Paper tape punch and reader visible in foreground

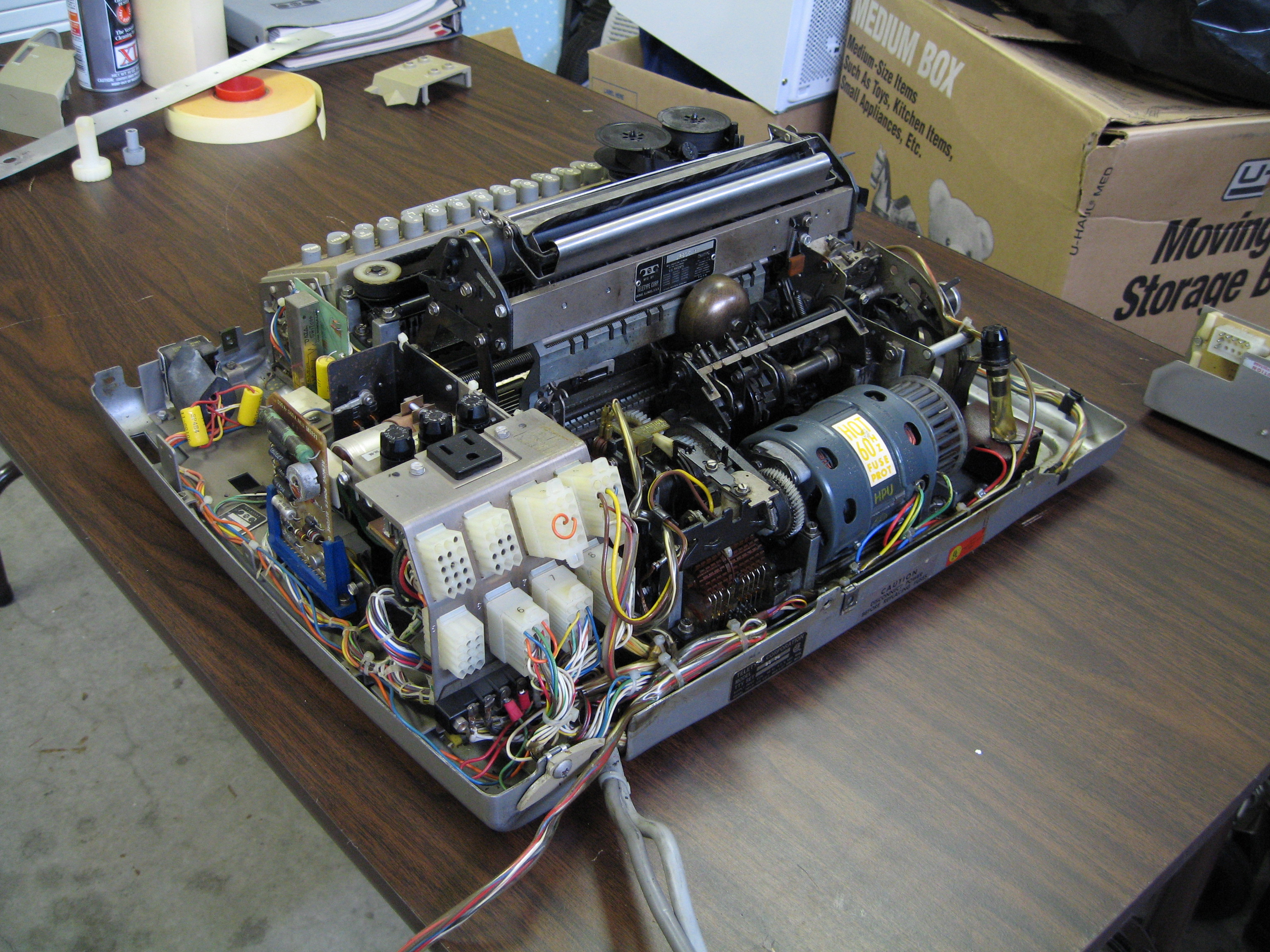
Rear of unit, with bell and answer back drum to left of motor

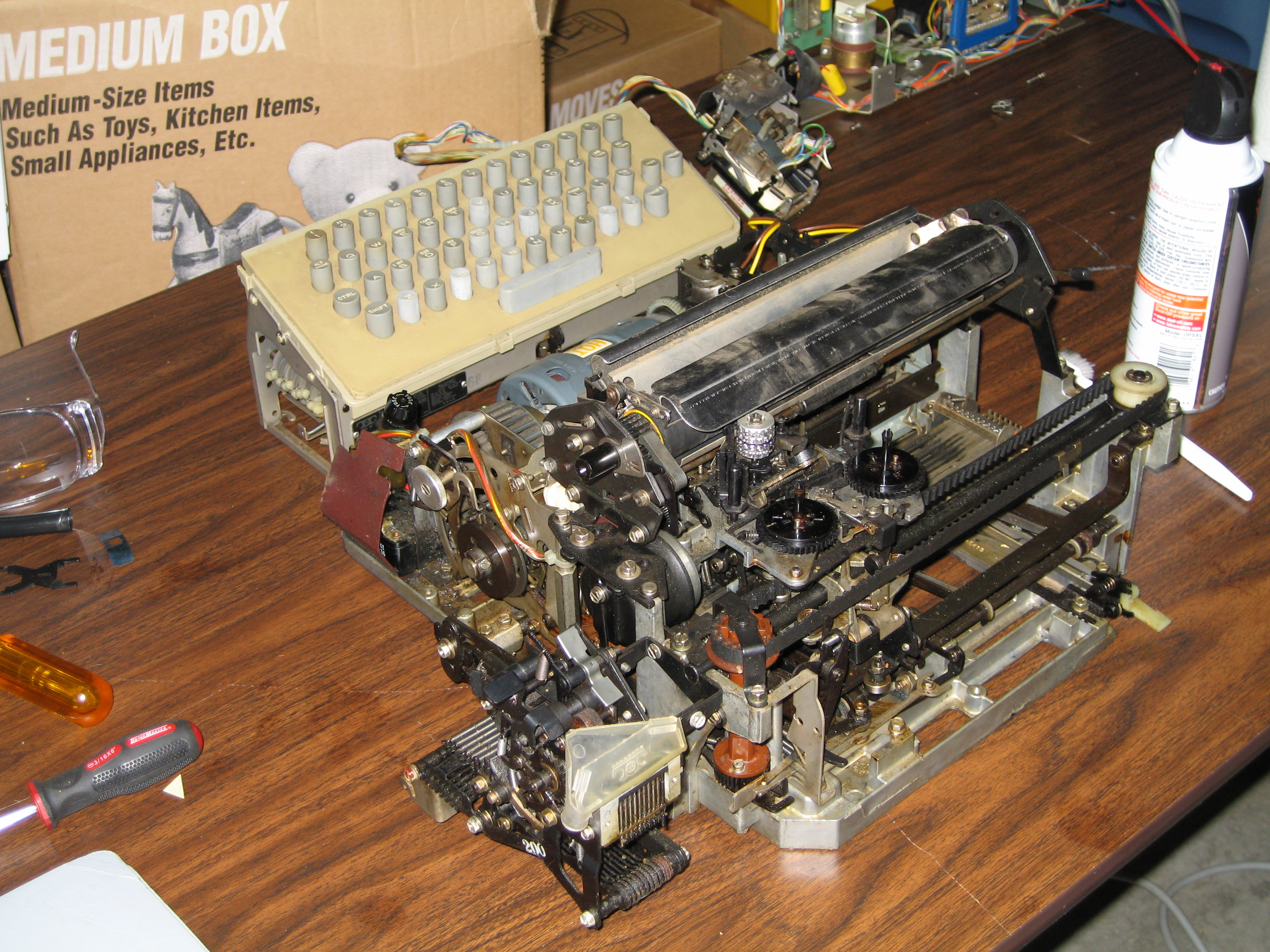
Fully-exposed mechanism

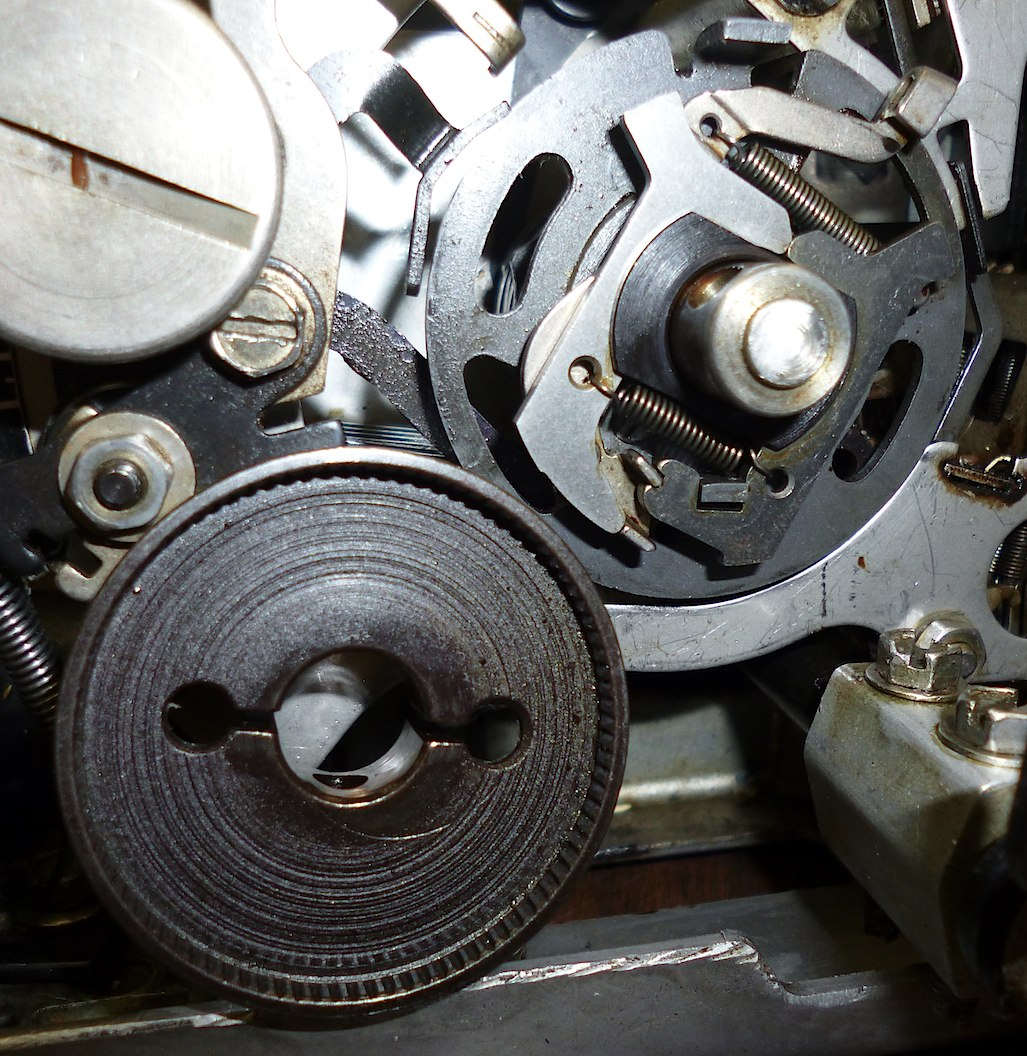
Mechanism which translated serial electrical pulses onto a parallel mechanical data bus

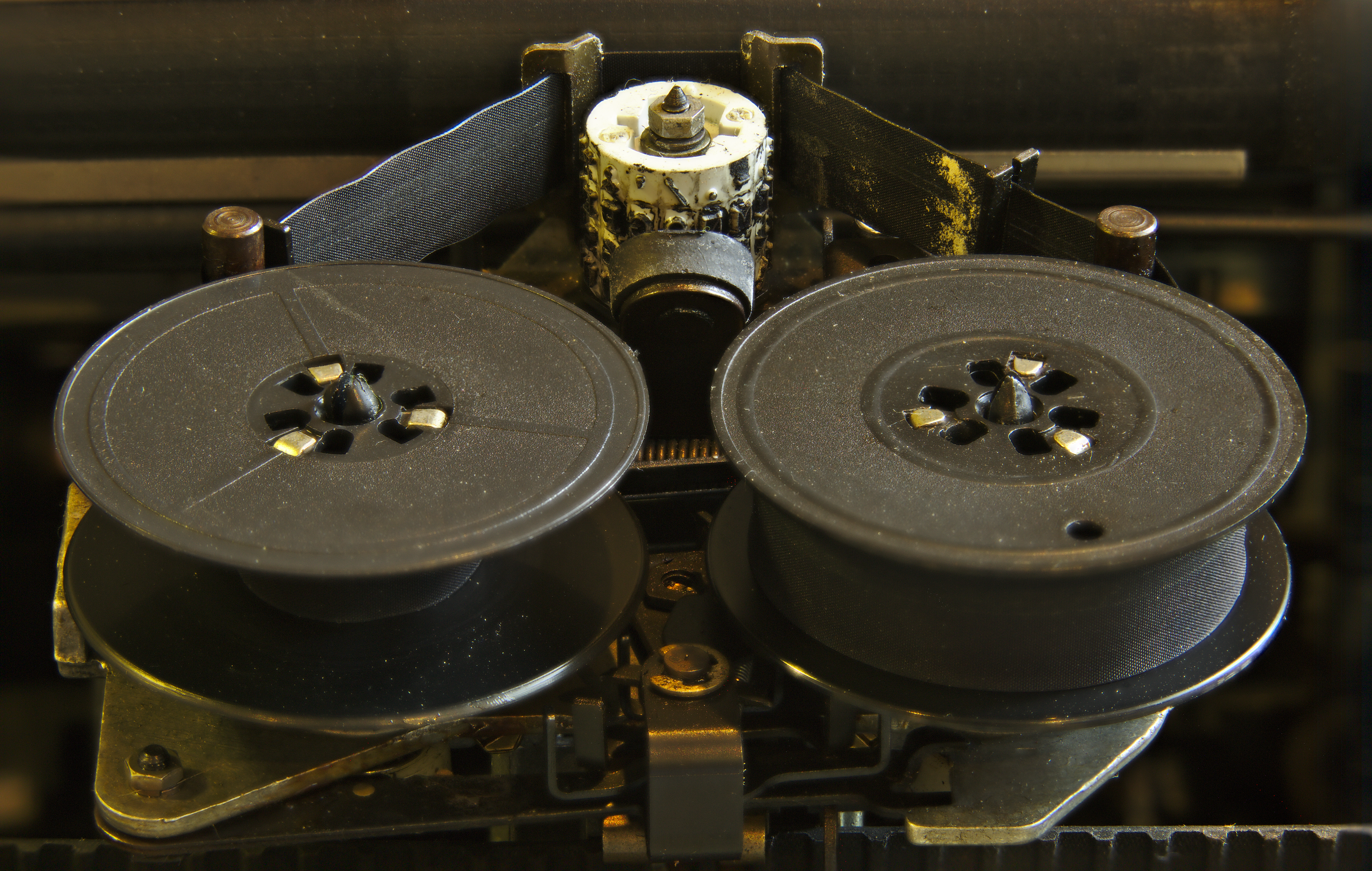
Closeup of a well-worn type element

=== Paper tape options ===
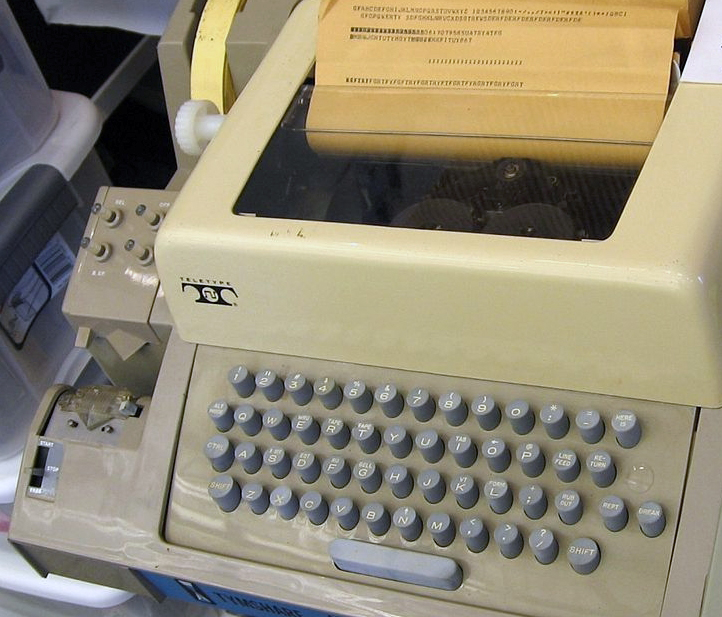
Teletype Model 33 ASR teleprinter keyboard with punched tape reader and punch. The left-front unit is the tape reader with its three-position START/STOP/FREE lever in the STOP position. A less-common tape reader had a four-position START/AUTO/STOP/FREE lever. In the AUTO position it could be commanded on and off remotely. The tape punch is the unit directly behind the reader. As it exits the machine, the tape passes under a triangular lip that allows the tape to be easily torn by lifting against the sharp edge of the lip.

As a cost-saving measure, the optional paper tape mechanisms were dependent on the keyboard and page printer mechanisms. The interface between the paper tape reader and the rest of the terminal is completely mechanical, with power, clock, and eight data bits (which Teletype called "intelligence") all transmitted in parallel through metal levers. Configuration of user-selectable options (such as parity) is done with mechanical clips that depress or release various levers. Sensing of punched holes by the paper tape reader is done by using metal pins which mechanically probe for their presence or absence. The paper tape reader and punch can handle eight-bit data, allowing the devices to be efficiently used to download or upload binary data for computers.

Earlier Teletype machine designs, such as the Model 28 ASR, had allowed the user to operate the keyboard to punch tape while independently transmitting a previously punched tape, or to punch a tape while printing something else. Independent use of the paper tape punch and reader is not possible with the Model 33 ASR.

The tape punch required oiled paper tape to keep its mechanism lubricated. There is a transparent, removable chad receptacle beneath the tape punch, which required periodic emptying.

=== Printing ===
The printing mechanism is usually geared to run at a maximum ten characters per second speed, or 100 words per minute (wpm), but other slower speeds were available: 60 wpm, 66 wpm, 68.2 wpm, and 75 wpm. There are also many typefont options. The Teletype Parts Bulletin listed 69 available Model 33 type element factory-installed options (frequent type element changes in the field were impractical). The type element, called a "typewheel" in Teletype's technical manuals, is cylindrical, with characters arranged in four tiers, 16 characters per tier, and thus is capable of printing 64 characters. The character to be printed is selected by rotating the typewheel clockwise or anticlockwise and raising or lowering it, then striking the typewheel with a padded hammer, which impacts the element against the ink ribbon and paper.

The Model 33 prints on 8.5-inch (220 mm) wide paper, supplied on continuous 5-inch (130 mm) diameter rolls approximately 100 feet (30 m) long, and fed via friction instead of a tractor feed. It prints at a fixed pitch of 10 characters per inch, and supported 74-character lines, although 72 characters is often commonly stated.

=== Keyboard ===
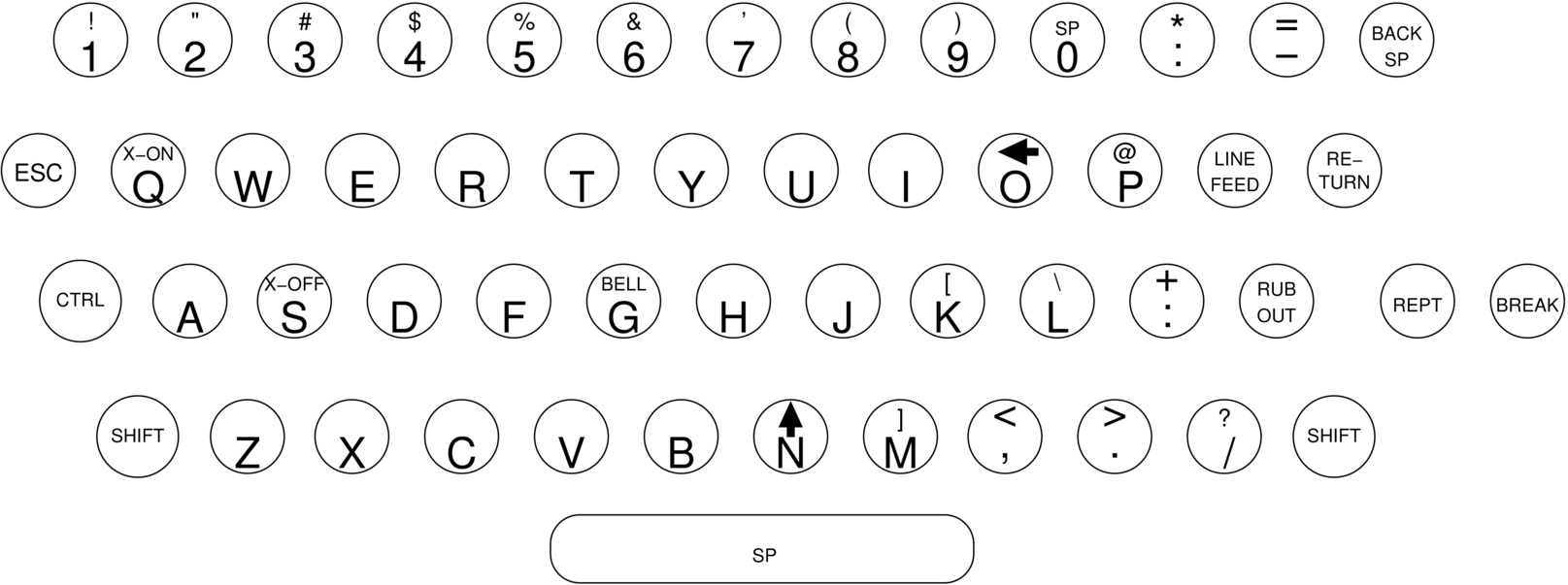
The Model 33 ASR keyboard supported an upper-case-only ASCII character subset.

The Model 33 keyboard generates the seven-bit ASCII code, also known as CCITT International Telegraphic Alphabet No. 5, with one (even) parity bit and two stop bits, with a symbol rate of 110 baud, but it only supports an upper-case subset of that code; it does not support lower-case letters or the `, {, |, }, and ~ characters.

The keyboard required heavy pressure to operate the keys - on par with a mechanical typewriter - far more than any modern keyboard.

The Model 33 can operate either in half-duplex mode, in which signals from the keyboard are sent to the print mechanism, so that characters are printed as they are typed (local echo), or in full-duplex mode, in which keyboard signals are sent only to the transmission line, and the receiver has to transmit the character back to the Model 33 in order for it to be printed (remote echo). The factory setting is half-duplex, but it can be changed to full-duplex by the user.

=== Answer-back and unattended operation ===
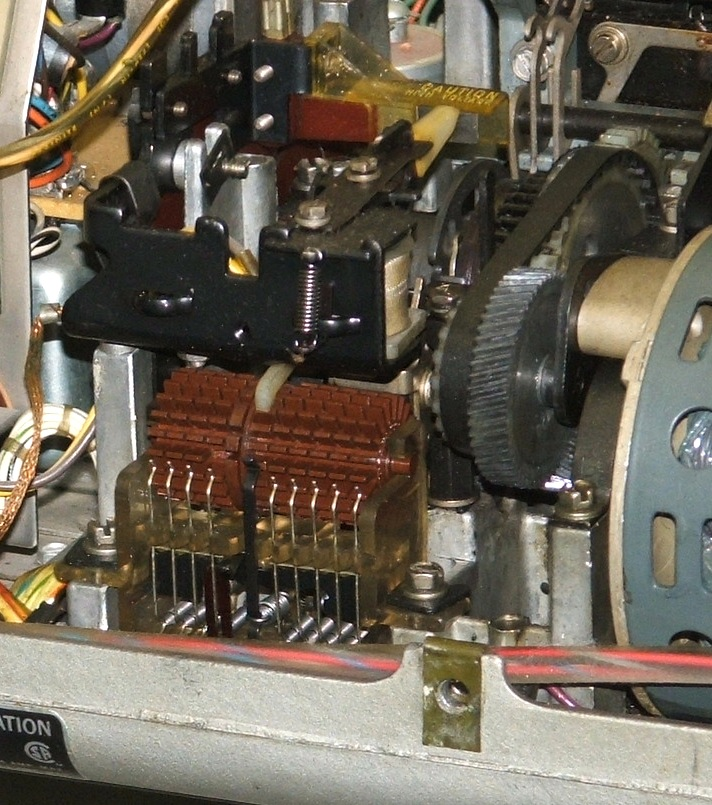
Closeup view of mechanically-programmable answerback camwheel

The Teletype Model 33 contains an answer-back mechanism that is generally used in dial-up networks such as the Teletypewriter Exchange Service (TWX). At the beginning of the message, the sending machine can transmit an enquiry character or WRU ("who are you") code, and the recipient machine automatically initiates a response, which is encoded in a rotating drum that had been preprogrammed by breaking off tabs. The answer-back drum in the recipient machine rotates and sends a unique identifying code to the sender, so that the sender can verify connection to the correct recipient. The WRU code can also be sent at the end of the message. A correct response confirms that the connection had remained unbroken during the message transmission. To conclude the transmission, the sending machine operator presses the disconnect button.

The receiving machine can also be set up to not require operator intervention. Since messages were often sent across multiple time zones to their destination, it was common to send a message to a location where the receiving machine was operating in an office that was closed and unstaffed overnight. This also took advantage of lower telecommunication charges for non-urgent messages which were sent at off-peak times.

The sole electric motor in the machine has to be left running continuously whenever unattended operation is expected, and is designed to withstand many hours of idling. The motor displays a "HOT" warning label, clearly visible once the cover is removed.

=== Communications interface ===
The communications module in the Model 33 is known as a Call Control Unit (CCU), and occupies the space to the right of the keyboard and printer. Various CCU types were available; most of them operated on the telephone network and included the relevant user controls. Variants included rotary dial, DTMF signalling or a mechanical card dialer. An acoustic coupler for a de facto standard-sized and shaped telephone handset was also available.

Another CCU type is called "Computer Control Private Line", which operated on a local 20 mA current loop, the de facto standard serial protocol for computer terminals before the rise of RS-232 signaling. "Private Line" CCUs had a blank panel with no user controls or displays, since the terminal can be semi-permanently hard-wired to the computer or other device at the far end of the communications line.

== Related machines ==
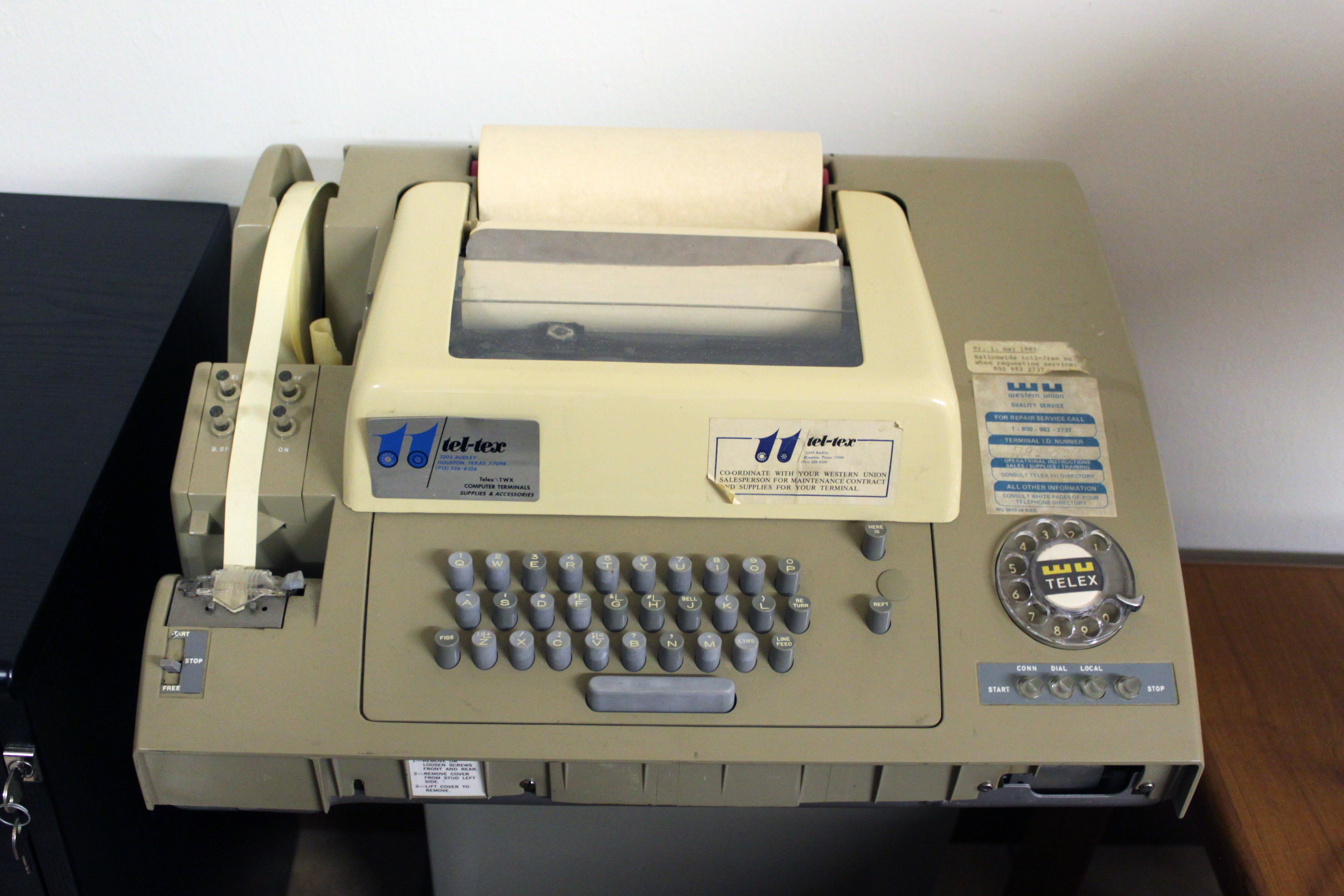
The Model 32, used for Telex service, had a three-row keyboard and narrower, five-hole paper tape.

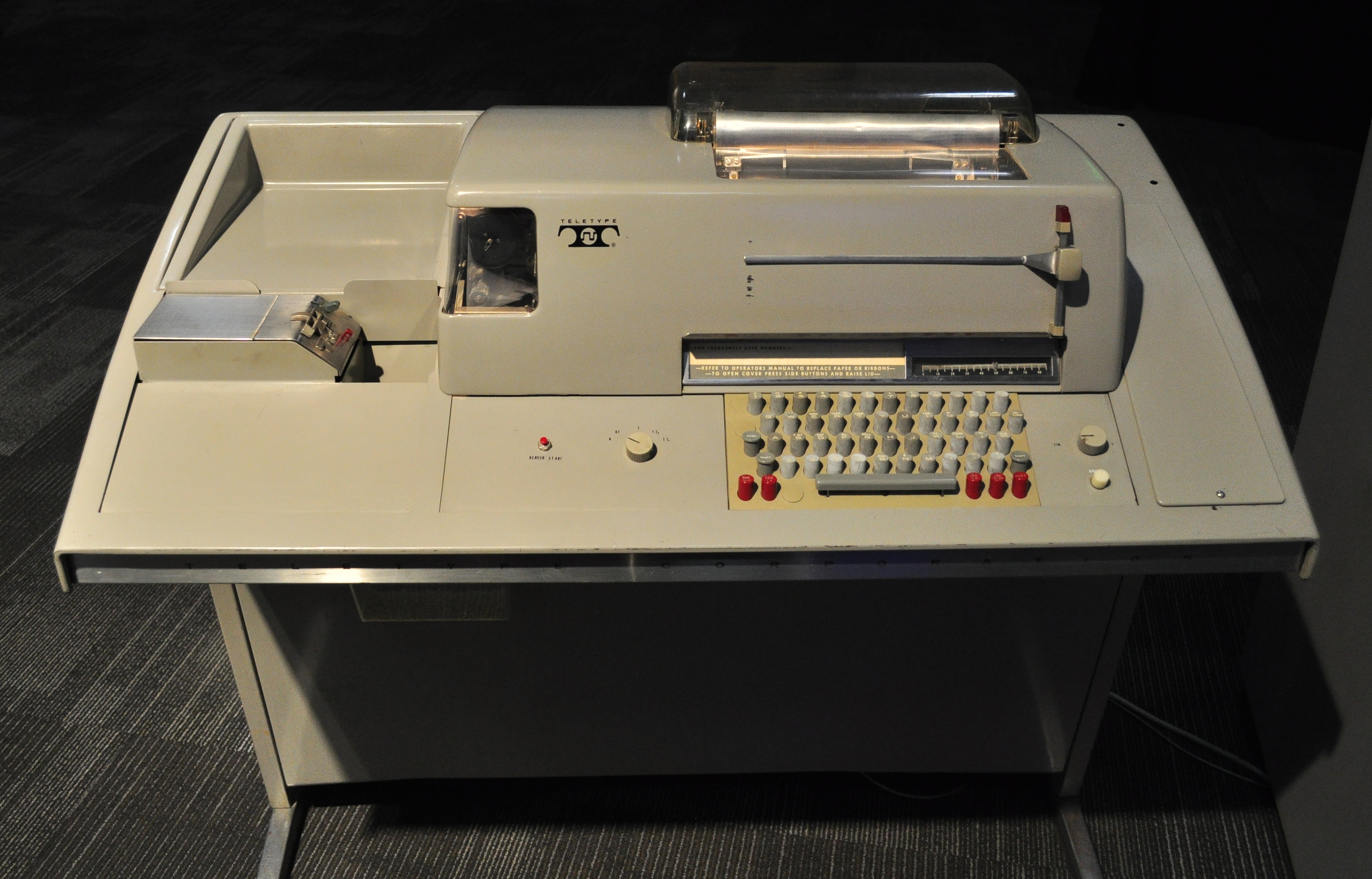
A Model 35 ASR, at the Living Computer Museum in Seattle

The Teletype Model 32 line used the same mechanism and looked identical, except for having a three-row keyboard and, on the ASR version, a five-hole paper tape reader and punch, both appropriate for Baudot code.

Teletype also introduced a more-expensive ASCII Model 35 (ASR-35) for heavy-duty use, whose printer mechanism is based on the older, rugged Model 28. The basic Model 35 is mounted in a light gray console that matched the width of the Model 33, while the Model 35 ASR, with eight-hole mechanical tape punch and reader, is installed in a console about twice as wide.

The tape reader is mounted separately from the printer-punch mechanism on the left side of the console, and behind it is a tray for storing a manual, sheets of paper, or other miscellanea. To the right of the keyboard is a panel that can optionally house a rotary dial or DTMF pushbuttons for dialing a connection to a network via telephone lines.

The printer cover in later units also feature soundproofing materials, making the Model 35 somewhat quieter than the Model 33 while printing and punching paper tapes. All versions of the Model 35 have a copy holder on the printer cover, making it more convenient for the operator when transcribing written material.

Teletype Model 35 is mentioned as being used in "Experiment One", in the first RFC, RFC 1. The Model 35 was widely used—the Computer History Museum (CHM) in Mountain View, California termed it "ubiquitous"— as terminals for the minicomputers and IMPs to send and receive text messages over the very early ARPANET, which later evolved into the Internet.

The Model 38 (ASR-38) was constructed similar to and has all the typing capabilities of a Model 33 ASR, plus additional features. A two-color inked ribbon and additional ASCII control codes allowed automatic switching between red and black output while printing. An extended keyboard and type element support uppercase and lowercase printing with some additional special characters. A wider pin-feed platen and typing mechanism allowed printing 132 columns on fan-fold paper, making its output similar to the 132-column page size of the then industry-standard IBM 1403 model printers.

More expensive Teletype systems have paper tape readers that used light sensors to detect the presence or absence of punched holes in the tape. These can work at much higher speeds (hundreds of characters per second). More sophisticated punches were also available that could run at somewhat higher speeds; Teletype's DRPE punch can operate at speeds up to 240 characters per second.

== Historical impact ==
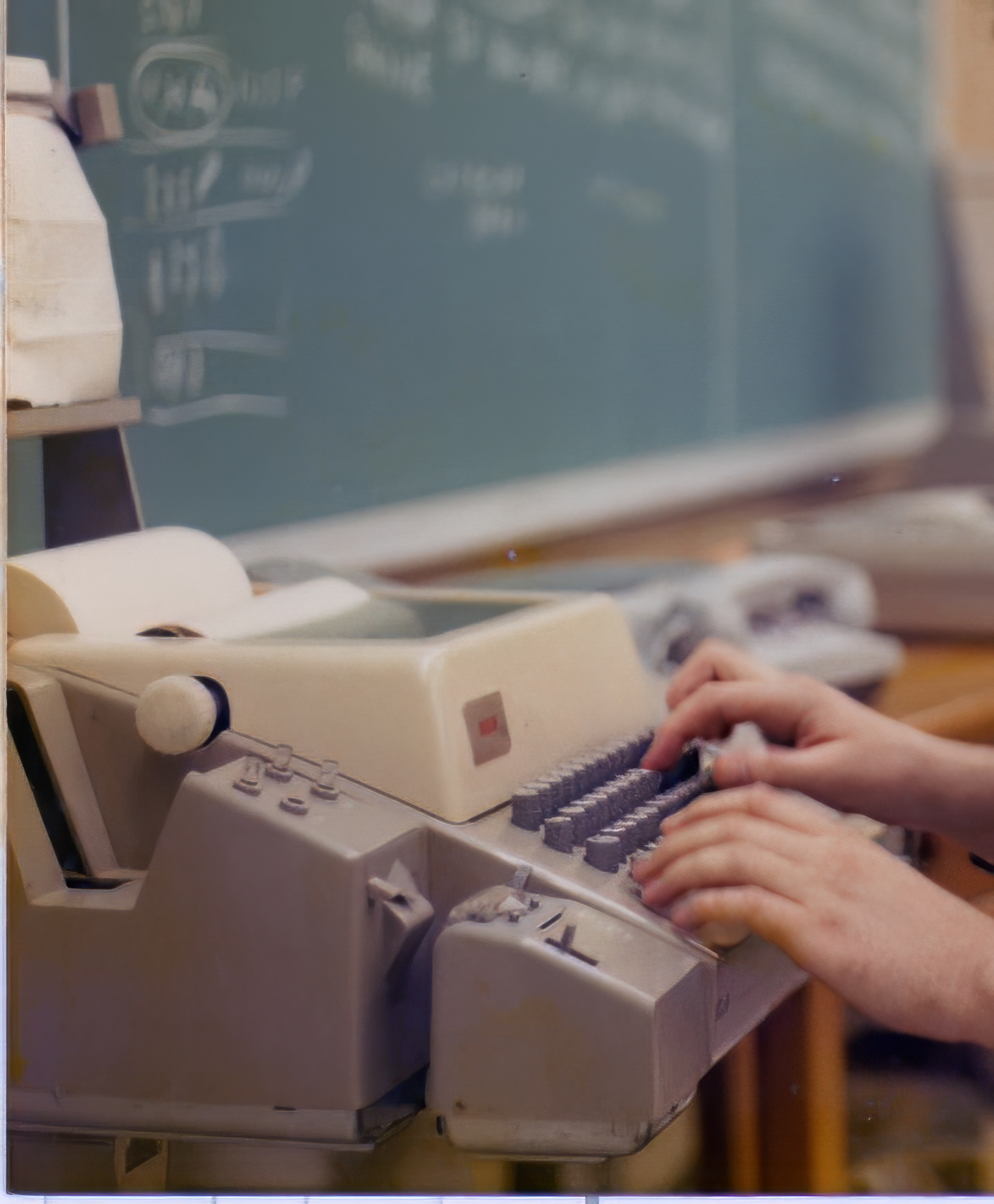
Model 33 ASR in use in 1978

- ASCII was first used commercially during 1963 as a seven-bit teleprinter code for American Telephone and Telegraph's Teletypewriter Exchange Service (TWX) using Teletype Model 33 teleprinters.
- The Teletype Model 33 series was influential in the development and interpretation of ASCII code characters. In particular, the Teletype Model 33 machine assignments for codes 17 (Control-Q, DC1, also known as XON) and 19 (Control-S, DC3, also known as XOFF) became de facto standards.
- The programming language BASIC was designed to be written and edited on a low-speed Teletype Model 33. The slow speed of the Teletype Model 33 influenced the user interface of minicomputer operating systems, including UNIX.
- A Teletype Model 33 provided Bill Gates' first computing experience.
- In 1965, Stanford University psychology professors Patrick Suppes and Richard C. Atkinson, in the pilot program for computer assisted instruction, experimented with using computers to provide arithmetic and spelling drills via Teletypes and acoustic couplers to elementary school students in the Palo Alto Unified School District in California and elsewhere.
- In 1971, Ray Tomlinson chose the "@" symbol on his Teletype Model 33 ASR keyboard for use in network email addresses.
- The serial ports in Unix-like systems are named /dev/tty..., which is short for "Teletype".

== See also ==
- Teletype Model 28
