= Ink ribbon =

Pigment-impregnated tape used in printing and typing

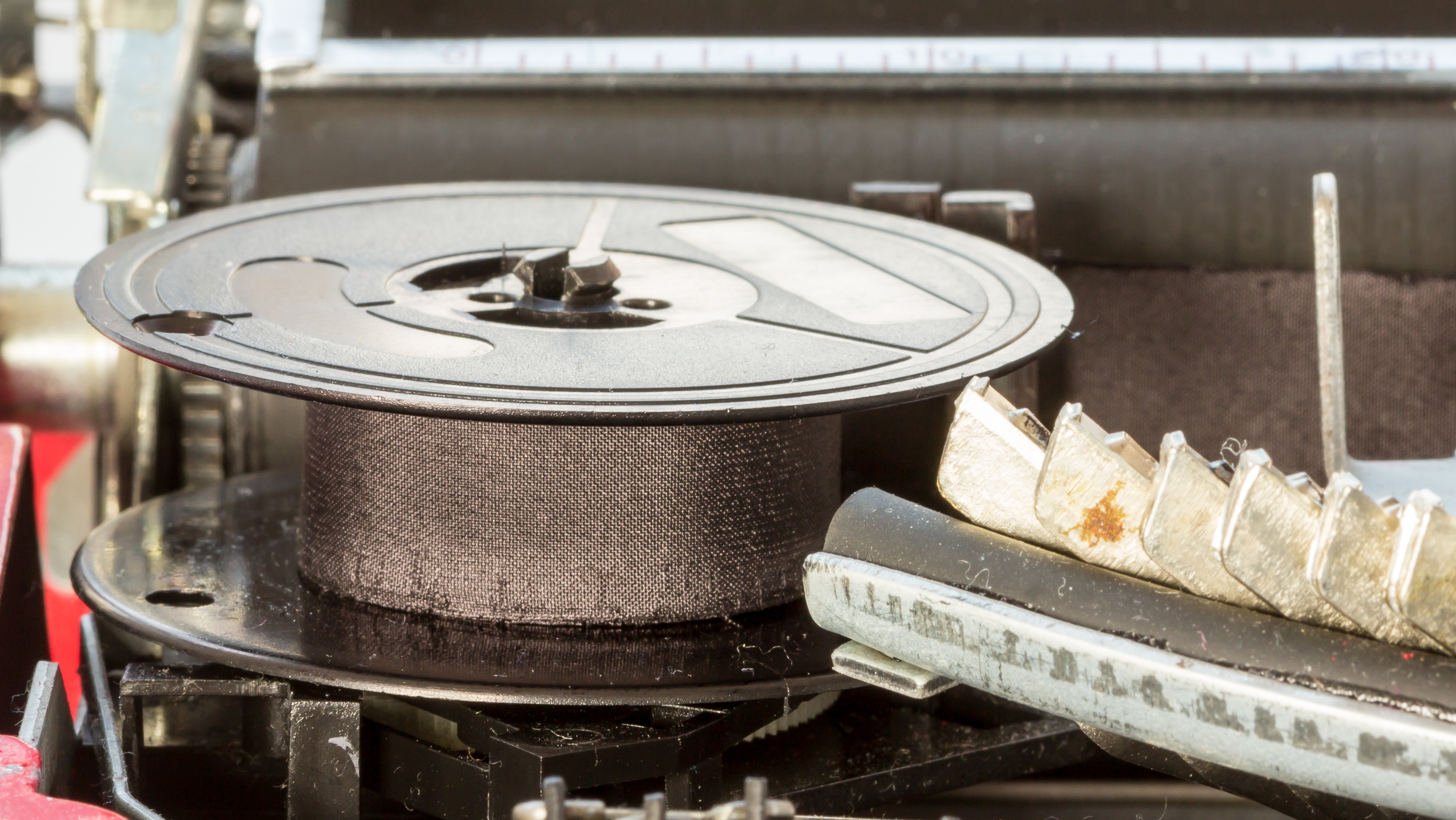
A typewriter ribbon with black ink in a mechanical typewriter

An ink ribbon or inked ribbon is an expendable assembly serving the function of transferring pigment to paper in various devices for impact printing. Since such assemblies were first widely used on typewriters, they were often called typewriter ribbons, but ink ribbons were already in use with other printing and marking devices. Ink ribbons are part of standard designs for hand- or motor-driven typewriters, teleprinters, stenotype machines, computer-driven printers, and many mechanical calculators. Thousands of varieties of ink ribbons and ribbon cartridges have been produced, and are available from stationery suppliers.

== Description ==
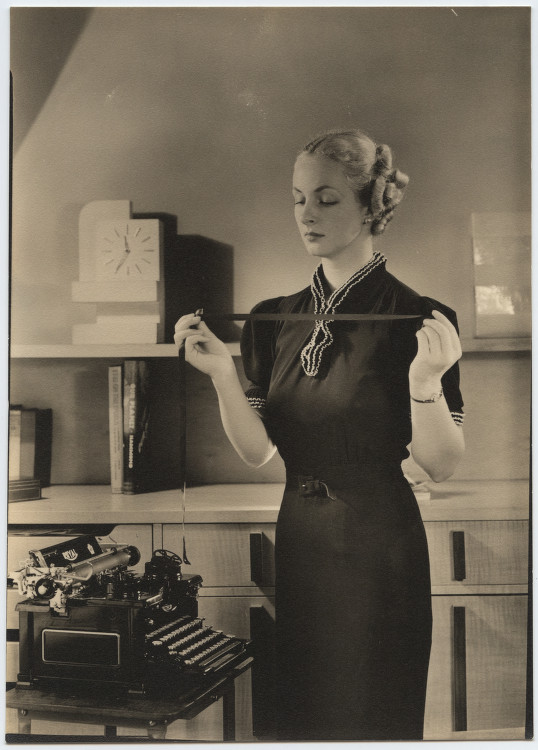
Woman holding typewriter ribbon at Royal Typewriter, c. 1930s

The prototypical assembly consists of a length of a medium, either pigment-impregnated woven ribbon or pigment-coated polymer tape, and a transport mechanism involving two axles. At any given moment, most of the length of the medium is wound as a close-spaced spiral around one axle or the other, tight enough for friction among turns to make it behave mostly like a solid cylinder. Rotation of the axles moves the ribbon or tape after each impact and usually aids in maintaining tension along the roughly straight-line path of the medium between the axles. The assembly may itself include mechanisms that control the tension in the temporarily unwound portion of the medium, or the typewriter/printer ribbon-advance mechanism may control the tension.

Some typewriter ribbons have two different colored pigments (usually black and red) running in parallel along the length of the ribbon. These ribbons are used with typewriters which have a selection lever ("bichrome ribbon switch") to slightly raise or lower the ribbon, so the typebars will print either color, as desired.

== Multi-strike (fabric) ribbons ==
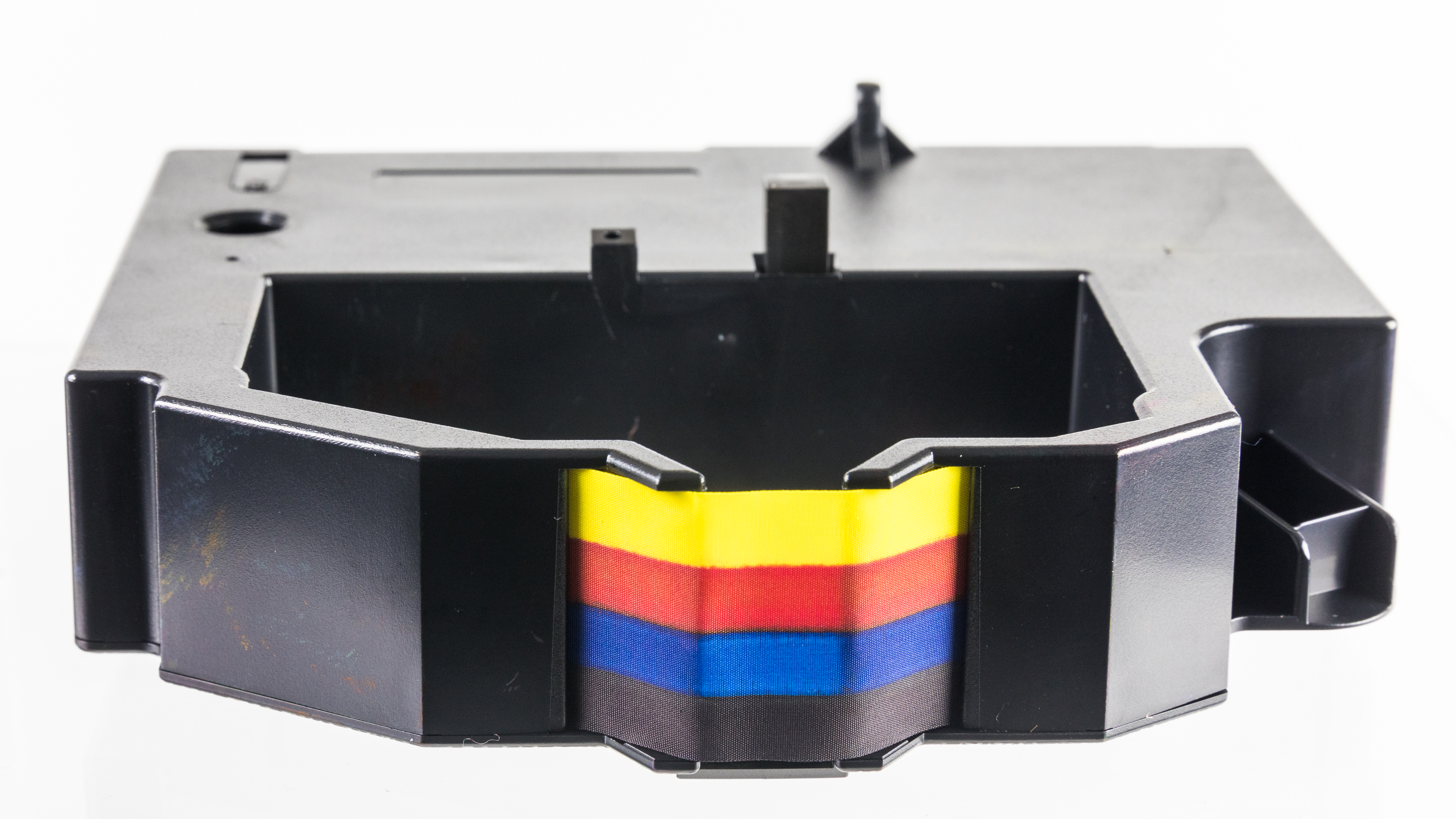
Four-color fabric ribbon cartridge for a dot-matrix printer

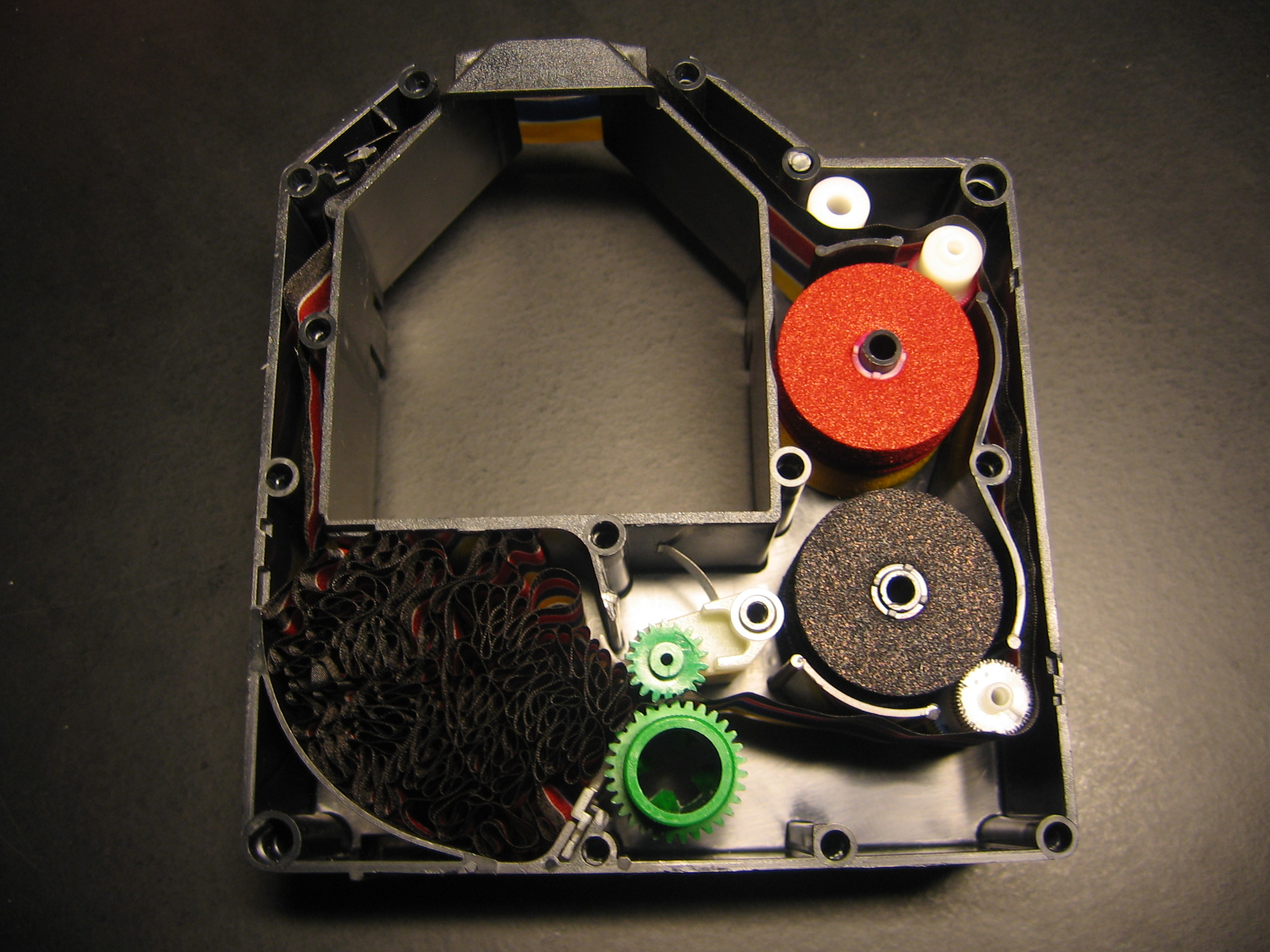
Ribbon cartridge with internal spools (cover removed)

Woven fabric typewriter ribbons were the first kind to be developed. With them, the pigment is an ink that dries on typing paper but not on the ribbon, and the ribbon is mounted at each end to a flanged reel whose hub engages with one of the axles. Only the axle onto which the ribbon is winding is driven, and the ribbon assembly is intended to work with an axle-driving mechanism that reverses the direction of rotation when the undriven axle reaches the point where there is almost no ribbon left wound around it.

Thus, the full length of the ribbon shuttles back and forth between reels, and each position along it is struck twice in each cycle of the ribbon's motion (once in the right-to-left phase and once in the left-to-right). This process can proceed indefinitely, until a depleting ink supply causes the typed characters to become unacceptably faint. Reversal of the ribbon was often controlled manually in early machines, but automatic reversal mechanisms became popular later.

An operator who judges a ribbon's ink supply to be too depleted typically manually winds the whole ribbon onto the fuller reel, releasing it from the empty one, and discarding the ribbon and the reel on which it is wound. It is replaced with a new ribbon that is purchased already wound on a single compatible reel. The attachment between reel and ribbon typically involves one grommet at each end of the ribbon that pierces the ribbon and engages with a hook on the hub of the corresponding reel. There often is a small grommet or eyelet near each end of the ribbon, which activates an automatic ribbon-reversal feature of the ribbon-advance mechanism.

An alternative design encloses two pre-threaded spools within a single disposable ribbon cartridge, eliminating the need to manually thread a messy ink ribbon. Cartridge designs are often used with higher-speed automatic printers, or ribbons with multiple inks used for color printing. Heavy-duty high-speed line printers may use wider ink ribbons, ranging up to the full width of a 132-column printout, nominally 14 inches (360 mm).

Another alternative design omits the spools, and simply stuffs inked ribbon into a plastic box through a narrow vertical slot, pulling it out the other end as needed. The box and ribbon are proportioned to avoid tangling inside the box. The ends of the ribbon are joined in an endless loop, so that a ribbon reversing mechanism is not needed. Some of these spool-less cartridge designs make a half-twist in the ribbon before joining it up into a loop, resulting in a Möbius strip. This is done to distribute wear and ink depletion more evenly throughout the ribbon, making it last longer.

Ink-depleted fabric ribbons can be re-inked to allow re-use, but this may be a messy procedure; many used fabric ribbons are instead discarded, along with the spool which they were wound around, or as part of a cartridge assembly. The de facto standard width of typewriter ribbons is 0.5 inches (13 mm), but some ribbon spools are no longer manufactured, requiring owners of vintage machines to re-ink used ribbons and/or to re-spool new ribbon onto their vintage spools.

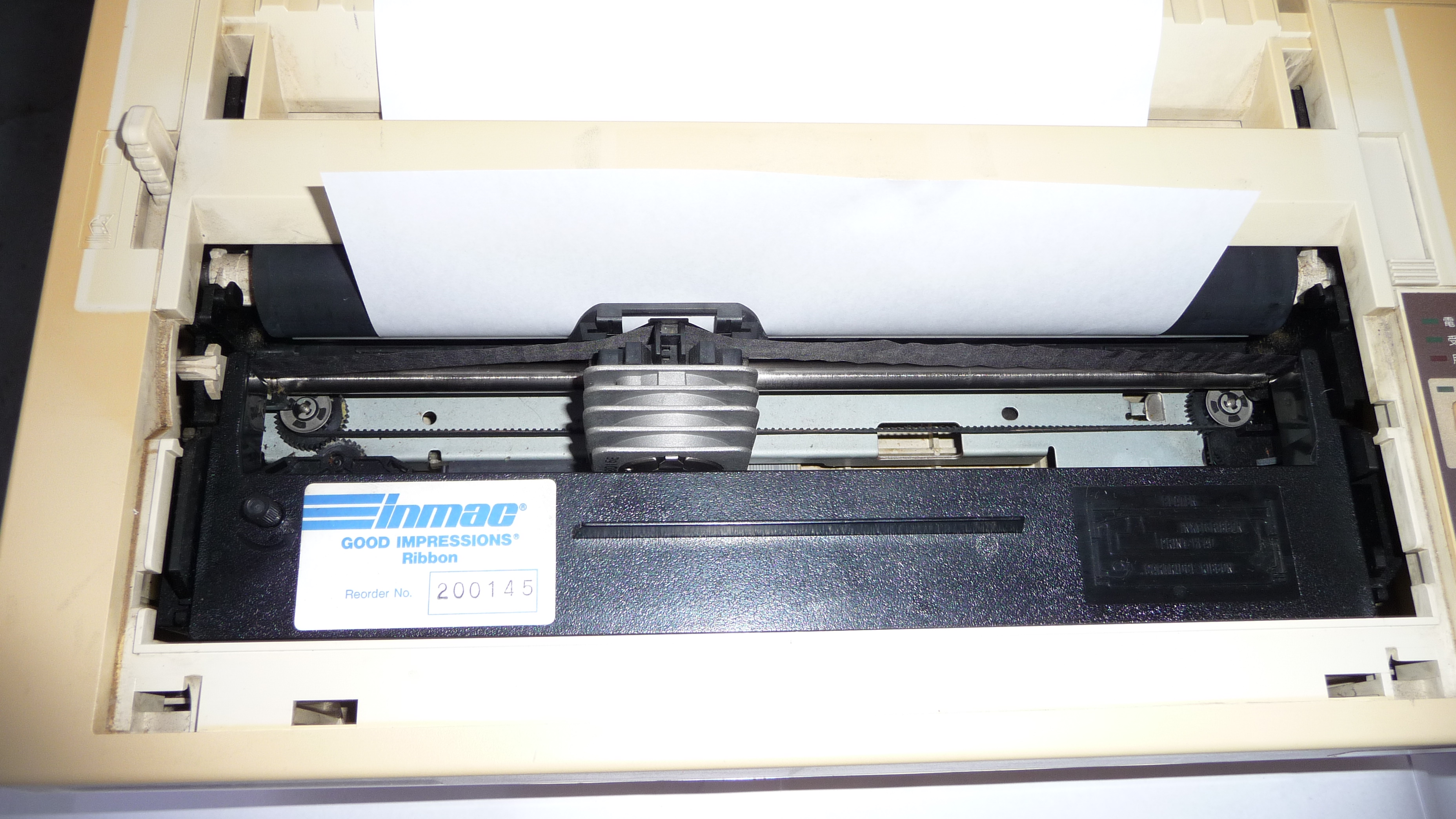
Large ink ribbon cartridge installed in a dot-matrix printer

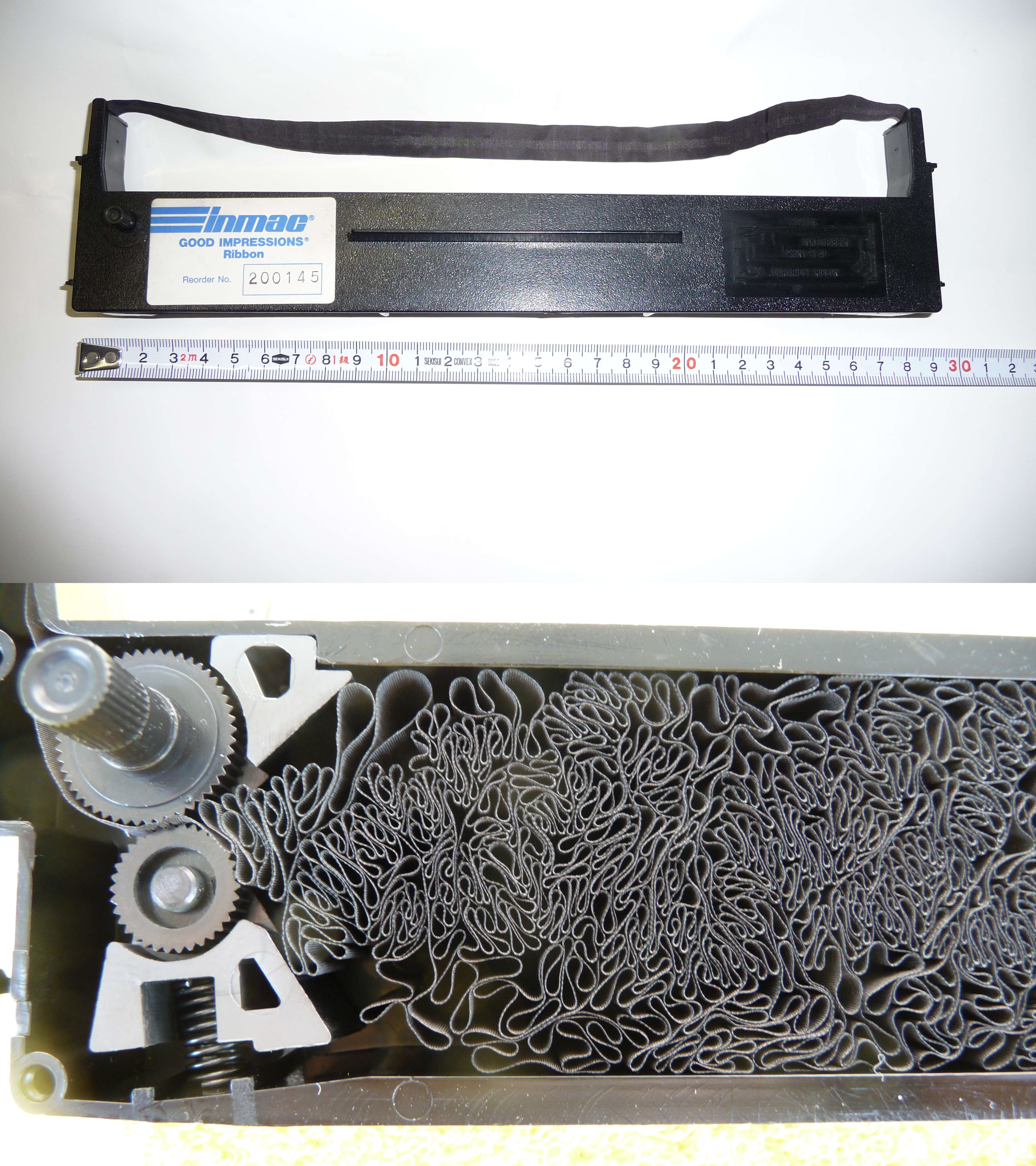
Spool-less ink ribbon cartridge with and without cover

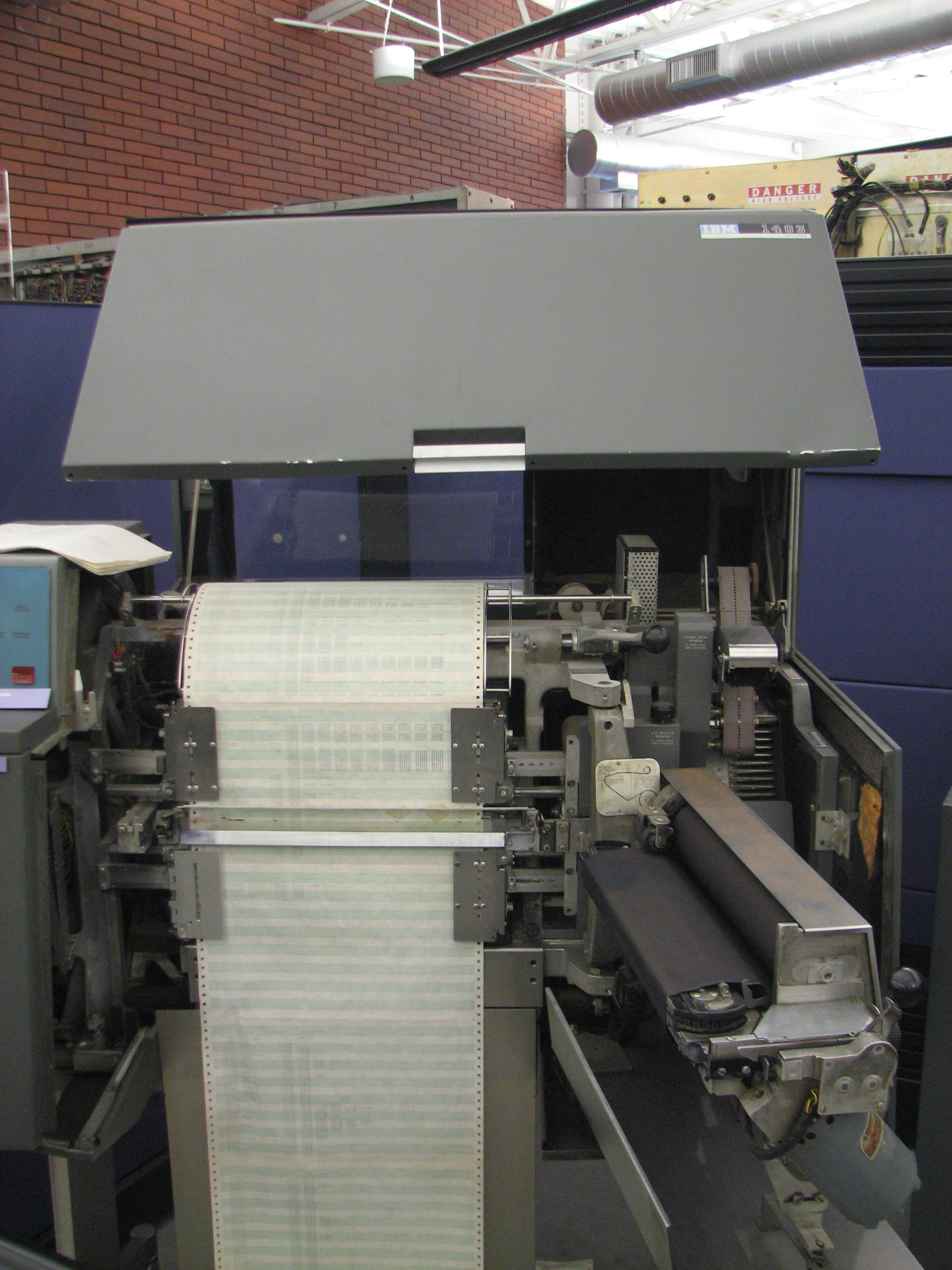
Wide ink ribbon can be seen at right of this opened IBM 1403 line printer

== Single-pass (polymer) ribbons ==
The IBM Selectric typewriter required ribbons of polymer (plastic) tape and popularized their use, even with other manufacturers. This type of ribbon is sometimes called a "carbon ribbon".

With this newer medium, the entire impacted area of the pigment coating adheres to the paper and transfers from the ribbon, producing typed copy with greater uniformity of character shape, reflecting a sharper contrast between the unmarked paper and the pigmented characters compared to cloth ribbons. This produces a clearer, easier-to-read printed image which looks more "professional" in printed documents.

However, the full-depth transfer of the pigment renders multiple passes over the same length of the ribbon unworkable, so the assembly is discarded after a single pass through its length. Because polymer tape is much thinner and more easily tangled than cloth ribbon, it usually is packaged in an enclosed cartridge with two spools, eliminating the need to manually thread a delicate ribbon onto an empty spool.

Deducing what has been typed by inspection of the used ribbon is far more practicable and reliable than with a cloth ribbon, so some users ensure secure destruction (shredding) of discarded one-time ribbons in order to prevent unintended disclosure of typed documents.

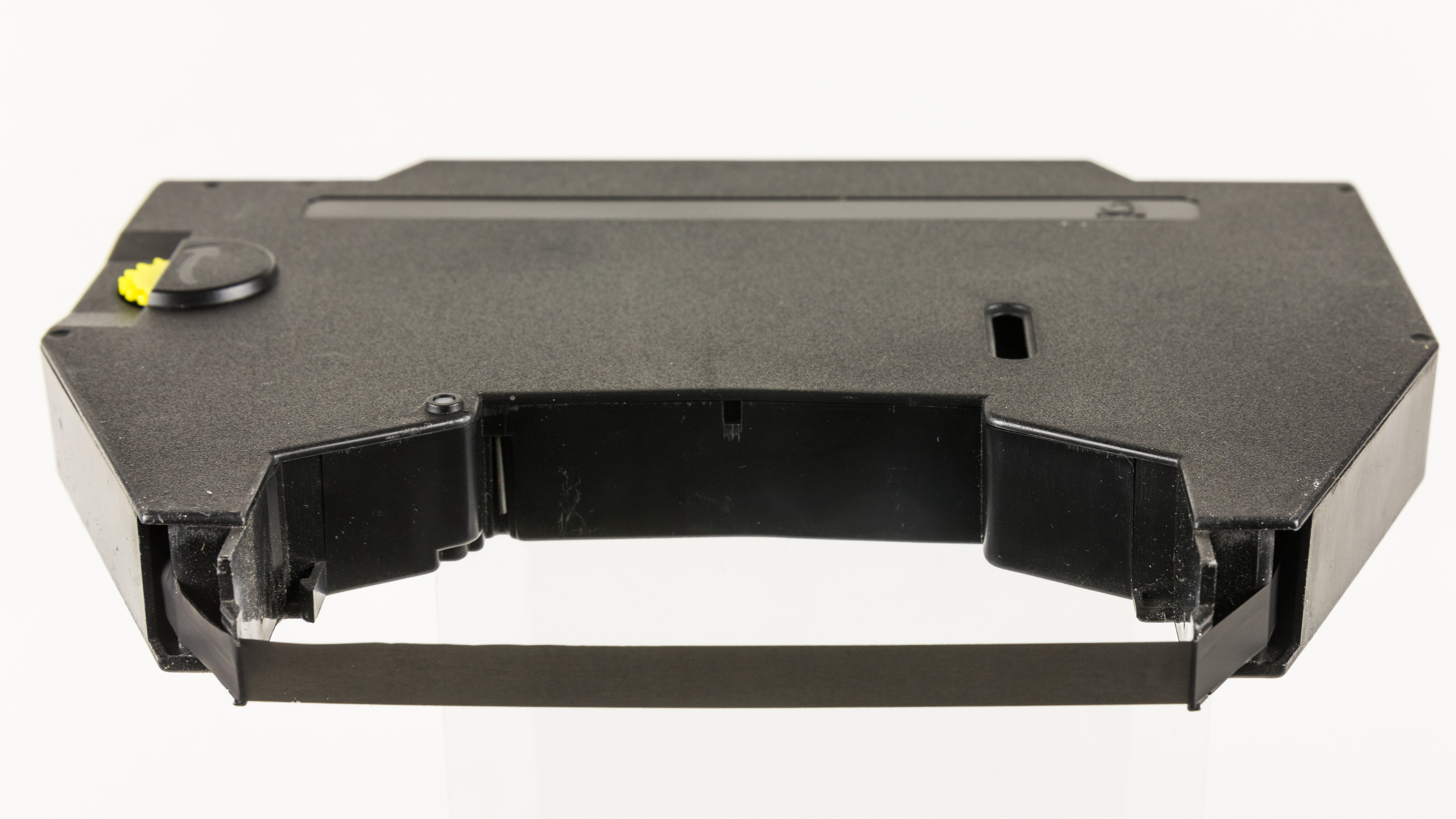
Typewriter ribbon cartridge with polymer tape

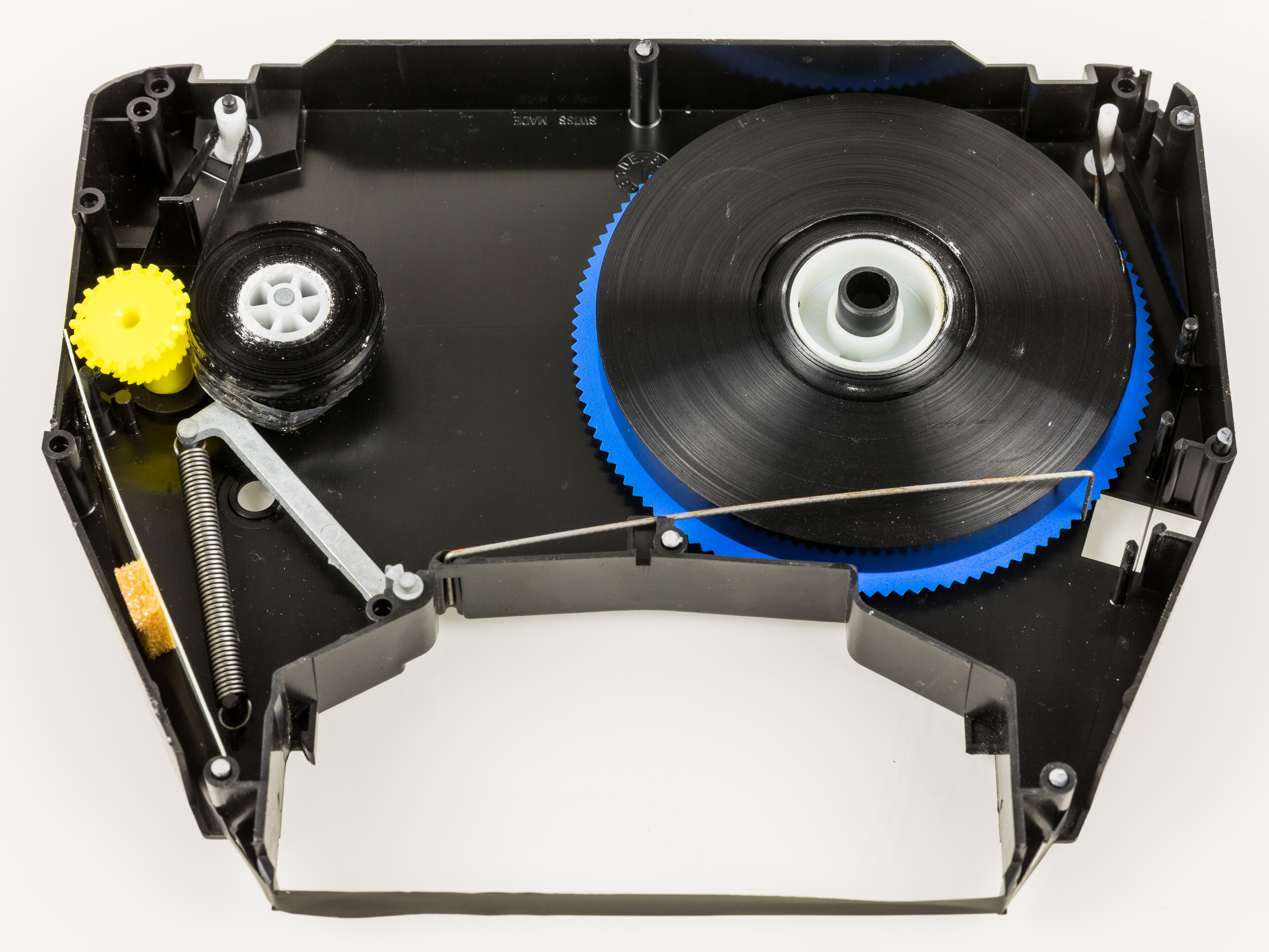
Ribbon cartridge with cover removed

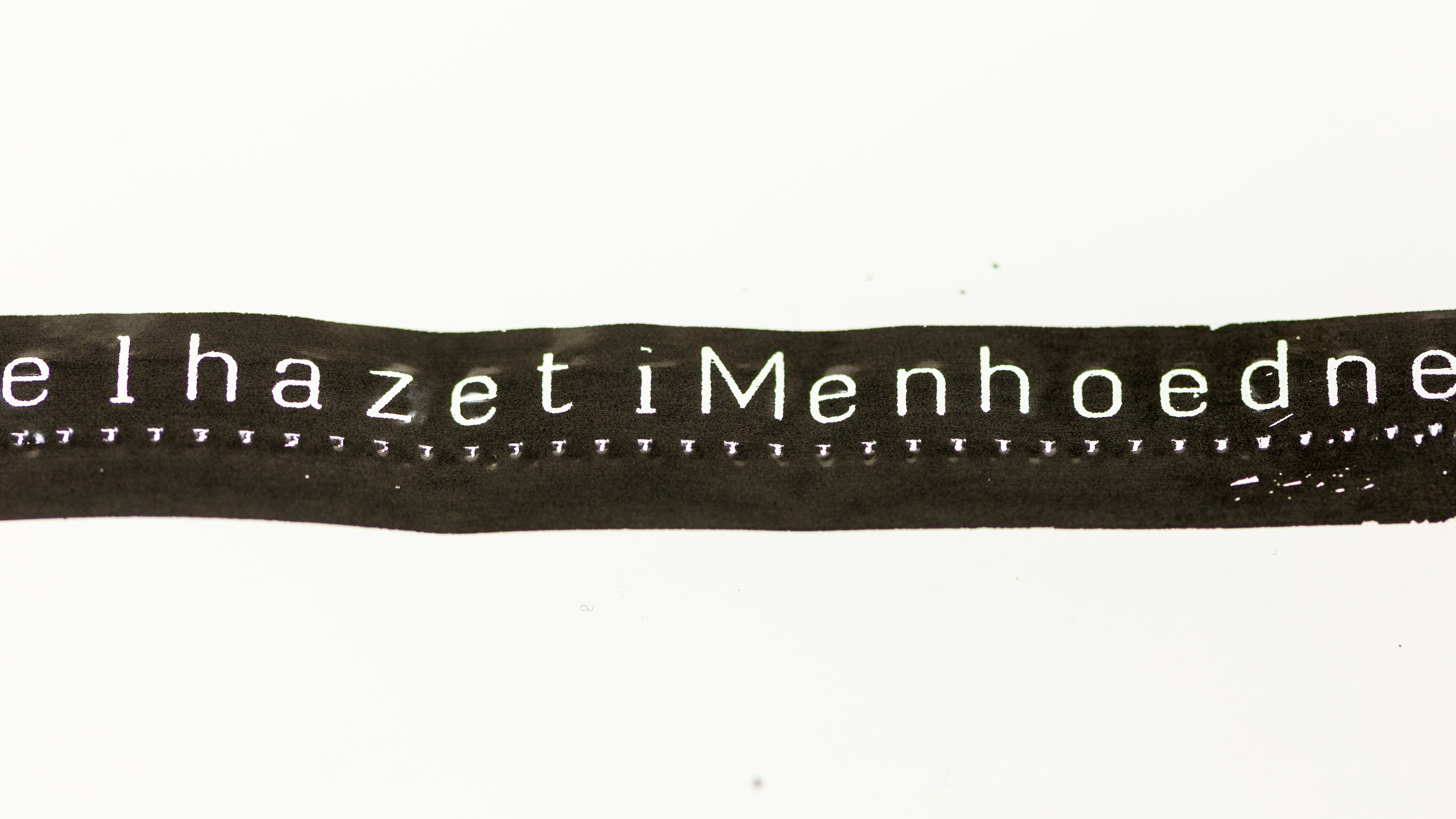
Used polymer ribbon reveals what has been typed

== History ==
There were many different schemes to supply ink to early typewriters, including ink-soaked rollers, ink pads, and rubberized cloth strips. Eventually, ink ribbons emerged as the de facto standard method of supplying ink for impact printers of all types.
