= Teletype Model 28 =

The Teletype Model 28 is a product line of teleprinters, typing and non-typing tape perforator and tape reperforators, fixed head single contact and pivoted head multi-contact transmitter-distributors, and receiving selector equipment. Regarded as the most rugged machines Teletype Corporation built, this line of teleprinters used an exchangeable type box for printing and sequential selector "Stunt Box" to mechanically initiate non-printing functions within the typing unit of the teleprinter, electrically control functions within the teleprinter and electrically control external equipment.

The Teletype Model 28 is more rugged and more expensive than later Teletype Model 32 machines. The Teletype Corporation introduced the Model 28 as a commercial product in 1953 after being originally designed for the United States military.

There are three versions of the Model 28 teleprinter:

- the Model 28 ASR, (Automatic Send and Receive), which has a built in 5-level paper tape reader and punch;
- the Model 28 KSR (Keyboard Send and Receive), which lacks the paper tape reader and punch;
- the Model 28 RO (Receive Only) which has neither a keyboard nor a paper tape reader/punch.

== History ==
Teletype Corporation's Model 28 line of communications terminals was first delivered to the US Military in 1951 and commercially introduced in 1953. This series of teleprinters and associated equipment was popular in the various branches of the United States Armed Forces, and commercially in the financial and manufacturing industries.

Teletype machines were gradually replaced in new installations by dot-matrix printers and CRT-based terminals in the mid to late 1970s. Basic CRT-based terminals which could only print lines and scroll them are often called glass teletypes to distinguish them from more sophisticated devices.

Teletype Corporation discontinued Model 28 production in 1981.

=== Model 28 ASR vs. ASR-28 ===
While the manufacturer called the Model 28 teleprinter with a tape punch and tape reader a Model 28 ASR, many users, specifically computer users, called this equipment an ASR-28. The earliest known source for this Teletype Corporation equipment naming discrepancy comes from Digital Equipment Corporation documentation where the September 1963 PDP-4 Brochure calls the Teletype Model 28 KSR a "KSR-28" in the paragraph titled "Printer-Keyboard and Control Type 65". This naming discrepancy continued from the Teletype Model 28 to other Teletype equipment in later DEC documentation.

== Technical information ==
The Teletype Corporation Model 28 Line of Equipment

The design objective for the Model 28 was a machine that would run at 100 words per minute with less maintenance than that required by a contemporary teletypewriter running at 60 words per minute. Additional design criteria included the requirements to run quieter and be lighter than previous teleprinters. The Model 28 equipment was also designed to successfully operate in a wider range of temperatures and operate in moving vehicles. The Model 28 equipment adjustments are made by turning screws and not by bending metal bars and levers as is done in the later Model 32 and Model 33 series of teleprinters. The Model 28 printing unit frame is lighter due to the use of stamped sheet metal instead of cast iron. The Model 28 ASR allowed the user to operate the keyboard to punch tape while transmitting a previously punched tape and to punch a tape while printing an incoming message.

One of the design advances in the Model 28 is the use of a compact and lightweight type box. In the Model 15, the moving carriage assembly weighs slightly over five pounds. The carriage assembly in the Model 28 weighs eight ounces. This weight reduction allows for a faster carriage return, necessary for 100 word-per-minute operation. The lighter carriage assembly effectively eliminates the effect of gravity on operation in the air and on the sea where level operation in not practical. The type box is easily removed, without tools, for cleaning and there are many type box options. The Teletype Parts Bulletin 1149-B. lists sixteen available Model 28 type box options. Another design advance in the Model 28 was the use of a new all-steel clutch that uses internal expansion to minimize wear and reduce the need for lubrication. The Model 28 series was also modular. The keyboard unit, the printing unit, the perforators and the transmitter distributors are self-contained and swappable to aid in troubleshooting and maintenance.

The Model 28 printing units contain a sequential selector, known as the Stunt Box, which monitors the received line and the keyboard signals for receipt of single characters and sequences of characters. Forty-two functional control positions are provided, some of which as used for functions such as carriage return, line feed, figures shift, letters shift, unshift-on-space and the signal bell. The removable Electrical Service Unit (LESU) is an integrated chassis housing the line fuse, convenience receptacle, terminal blocks for wiring options and mounting facilities for optional sub-assemblies.

The Model 28 is usually geared to run at maximum speed ten characters per second speed, i.e. 100 words per minute (wpm), but other speeds are available. These speeds include 60 wpm, 61 wpm, 65 wpm, 66 wpm, 67 wpm, 71 wpm, 75 wpm, 81 wpm, 88 wpm, 100 wpm, 106 wpm, 107 wpm and 200 wpm (on some paper tape equipment).

== Teletype Model 28 line of equipment ==
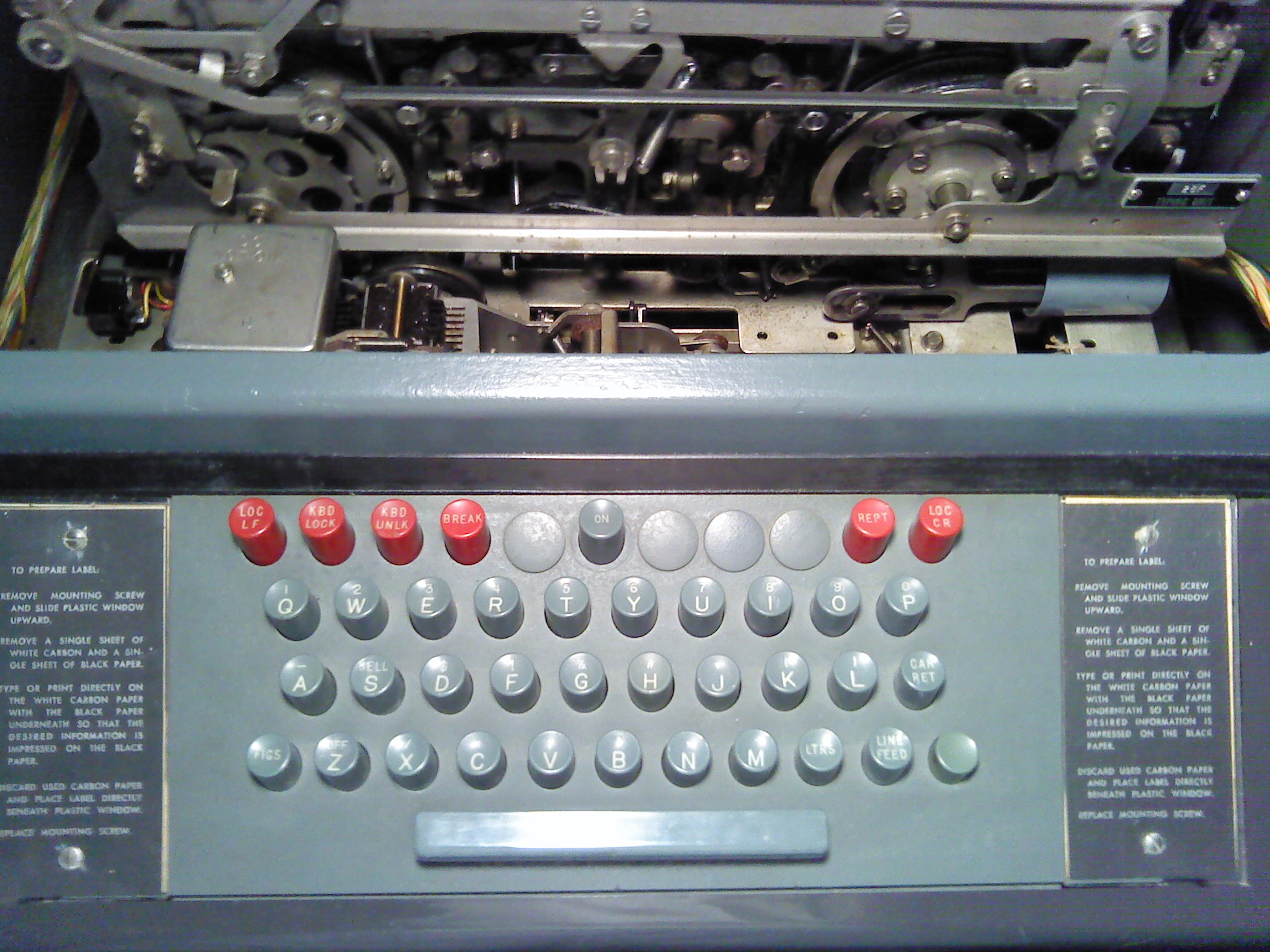
Teletype Corporation Model 28 KSR keyboard

Model 28 Keyboard Send-Receive Page Printer

The Teletype Model 28 KSR, first delivered to the United States Navy in 1951, represented approximately twelve years of research and design. The KSR is composed of a keyboard base (LK) which supports the motor unit (LMU) and the typing unit (LP) and incorporates the code selecting and signal generator mechanisms.

The standard Teletype three-row keyboard is expanded on the Model 28 with the addition of special keys, normally colored red, which allow the operator to control keyboard line break, keyboard lock and unlock, repeat operation, and local carriage return and local line feed. The keyboard base, with the attached motor unit and typing unit, is pivotally mounted a cradle within the cabinet and swings outward for maintenance. Unlike previous machines, all mechanical controls, such as the Model 15 manual platen crank, are brought to the front so that machines can be positioned side by side in rows. Electrical accessories, such as the line relays, motor relays and power fuses are mounted in a separate removable chassis called the Electrical Service Unit. A separate shelf is available in the console base for ancillary equipment such as rectifiers and is also used to store local installation documentation.

The Teletype Model 28 KSR was produced as a floor, table and wall model. The floor model is 40 inches high, 20.5 inches wide and 18.5 inches deep, excluding the keyboard, and weighs 130 pounds. The table model is 16 inches high, 20.5 inches wide and 18.5 inches deep, excluding the keyboard, and weighs 130 pounds. The keyboard extends 4.5 inches. The wall model is 30 inches high, 16.5 inches wide and 14.5 inches deep and weighs 110 pounds. The keyboard extends 4.5 inches. This machine, using the standard synchronous motor, uses less than 1.5 amps at 115VAC 60 Hz. The recommended operating environment is a temperature of 40 to 110 Fahrenheit, a relative humidity of 2 to 95 percent and an altitude of 0 to 10,000 feet. The printing paper is an 8.44 inch by 4.5 inch diameter roll. Ribbons are 0.5 inch wide by 60 yards long with plastic spools and eyelets for proper ribbon reverse operation.

Model 28 Automatic Send-Receive Set

The Teletype Model 28 ASR, introduced in 1957, was designed and built using existing stand-alone components and packaged as a console. The Model 28 ASR incorporates tape punch and tape reader components in addition to the keyboard, printer, electrical service unit, console and motor used in the Model 28 KSR.

The Model 28 ASR keyboard base (LAK) supports the tape punch in addition to motor unit (LMU), typing unit (LP) and the code selecting and signal generator mechanisms of the Model 28 KSR. The Model 28 ASR tape reader, also known as the transmitter-distributor, is mounted separately but powered by the same motor unit that powers the keyboard and typing unit.

Four different tape punch units are available for use with the Model 28 ASR. These are the non-typing perforator (LPE), typing perforator (LTPE), non-typing reperforator (LRPE) and typing reperforator (LPR). Similarly, there are four different tape reader options. These are the fixed head single contact transmitter-distributor (LXD), pivoted head multi-contact transmitter-distributor (LAXD), fixed head multi-contact transmitter-distributor (LBXD) and pivoted and fixed head multi-contact transmitter-distributor (LCXD). There is also an option that installs a second tape punch, usually a typing reperforator (LPR) under the dome just behind the tape reader. The second tape punch is driven by its own motor.

The Teletype Model 28 ASR is 40 inches high, 36 inches wide and 18.5 inches deep, excluding the keyboard. The keyboard extends 4.5 inches. The Teletype Model 28 ASR weighs 260 pounds. This machine, using the standard synchronous motor, uses less than 1.5 amps at 115VAC 60 Hz. The recommended operating environment is a temperature of 40 to 110 Fahrenheit, a relative humidity of 2 to 95 percent and an altitude of 0 to 10,000 feet. The printing paper is an 8.44 inch by 4.5 inch diameter roll and the paper tape is a one inch by 1000 foot roll. Ribbons are 0.5 inch wide by 60 yards long with plastic spools and eyelets for proper ribbon reverse operation.

Model 28 Receive Only Page Printer

The Teletype Model 28 RO is composed of a receive-only base (LB) which supports the motor unit and the typing unit (LP) and incorporates the code selecting mechanisms. The Teletype Model 28 RO is 40 inches high, 20.5 inches wide and 18.5 inches deep.

The Teletype Corporation Model 28 Receiving Selector

Model 28 Receiving Selector

The Model 28 Receiving Selector, also known as the LRS, converts incoming serial teletypewriter signals into parallel-wire intelligence. This equipment is capable of operating at 60, 75 or 100 words per minute and operates on a five-level start-stop code, with an option for six-level start-stop code. This unit is equipped with two types of contacts - code reading and timing contacts. The Model 28 Receiving Selector, equipped with a standard 115 VAC 60 Hz synchronous motor, is 8 inches high, 8.5 inches wide and 9.75 inches deep and weighs 16.5 pounds.

Model 28 Tape Punch

The Model 28 Tape Punches, also known as a tape perforators, are receiving-only five-level devices that is actuated by incoming line signals and perforates standard 11/16 inch paper tape. These tape punches are self-contained and motor-driven, operating at speeds up to 100 words-per-minute. The Model 28 family of tape punches includes the non-typing perforator (LPE), typing perforator (LTPE), non-typing reperforator (LRPE) and typing reperforator (LPR).

Model 28 Tape Reader

The Model 28 Tape Readers, also known as a transmitter-distributors, are transmitting-only five, six, seven or eight level devices that automatically converts chadless or fully perforated paper tape into electrical impulses. These devices are self-contained and motor-driven and operate at speeds up to 200 words-per-minute. In some equipment, these electrical signals are transmitted over a single asynchronous serial telegraph channel to local or remote receiving stations. In other cases, the tape readers provide output on a parallel-wire basis. The Model 28 family of tape readers includes the fixed head single contact transmitter-distributor (LXD), pivoted head multi-contact transmitter-distributor (LAXD), fixed head multi-contact transmitter-distributor (LBXD), pivoted and fixed head multi-contact transmitter-distributor (LCXD) and tape reader parallel-wire transmitter (LX).

Model 28 Reperforator Transmitter-Distributor Set

The Teletype Model 28 RT Set is punched tape message and data relay set that receives, punches, prints, stores, reads and transmits five-level paper tape. The receiving unit accepts incoming electrical signals and punches and prints the intelligence on five-level paper tape. The sending unit reads and translates the taped intelligence into electrical impulses for transmission either cross-office or cross-country. The paper tape readers and punches can be geared at speeds up to 200 words-per-minute. Gears are also available for slower speed operation at 60, 75 or 100 words-per-minute. Optional three-speed gear-shift mechanisms are also available for manual speed change operation at speeds of 60, 75 and 100 words-per-minute. The tape handling unit contains a large capacity tape supply reel capable of storing up to 3000 feet of paper tape, an intermediate tape storage bin that handles approximately 100 feet of paper tape and a tape winder reel that will store 1000 feet of paper tape. The Model 28 RT Set, less cabinet, is 35 inches high, 8.5 inches wide and 20 inches deep and weighs 110 pounds. The Model 20 RT Set cabinet, which houses up to two RT Sets, is 60 inches high, 28 inches wide and 27 inches deep and weighs 300 pounds. The RT Set cabinets may be side mounted.

The Teletype Corporation Model 28 Tape Punch Set

Model 28 Tape Punch Set

The Model 28 Tape Punch Set is a multi-magnet reperforator, also known as the LARP, and capable of producing 5, 6, 7 or 8 level paper tape at speeds up to 20 characters per minute from a parallel wire input. The Model 28 Tape Punch Set uses a standard 115 VAC 60 Hz synchronous motor is 9.75 inches high, 15.5 inches wide and 10 inches deep and weighs 24 pounds.

== Interface ==
There were different kinds of Model 28 interfaces that included Rotary Dial, current loop and polar signaling.

== Related machines ==
The Model 35 line, built for ASCII, used a similar mechanical structure and shared numerous parts.
