= Pacific Cyber/Metrix =

American computer company

PCM Systems Corporation
- Logo from 1996 to 2001
- Formerly: PCM, Inc. (1975); Pacific Cyber/Metrix (1975–1996)
- Type: Private
- Industry: Computers
- Founded: 1975; 51 years ago
- Defunct: 2001; 25 years ago
- Fate: Dissolved
- Headquarters: San Ramon, California (1975–1979); Dublin, California (1979–2001)
- Key people: Robert Nelson, president
- Number of employees: 15 (early 2000s)
- Website: pcmsystems.com at the Wayback Machine (archived 1997-04-14)

Pacific Cyber/Metrix, Inc. (PC/M; originally PCM, Inc., later PCM Systems) was a privately held American computer company based in California. The company was founded in 1975 in San Ramon, California. The company was initially known for its products based on the Intersil 6100 processor, including its PCM-12 minicomputer, which were all mostly software compatible with the Digital Equipment Corporation's PDP-8/E. Later on it entered the EPROM burner market and developed bubble memory modules for various microcomputers. In the 1990s, the company pivoted to creating digital signal processors for imaging, signal analysis, and scientific instrumentation.

== History ==
=== 1970s ===
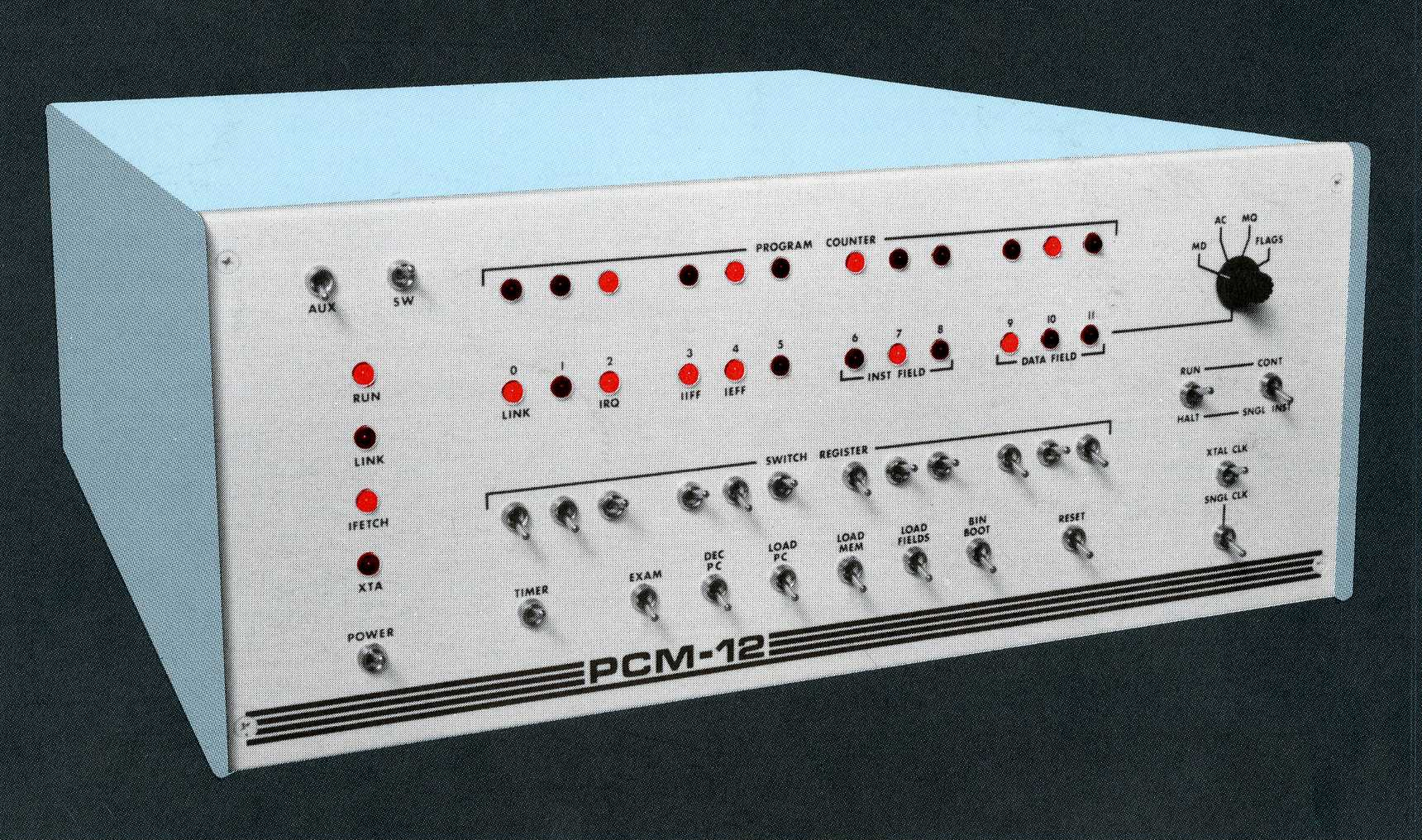
Front view of the PCM-12

PC/M was founded in San Ramon, California, in 1975. It was founded by Robert Nelson and several others, most of whom including Nelson came from the San Ramon facility of Edgerton, Germeshausen, and Grier, a scientific research firm. Nelson was named president and general owner. For the next several years the company developed microcomputers based around the PDP-8–compatible Intersil 6100 as well as CMOS EPROM burners. The company earned profit from the cash flow generated by their products and received no outside venture capital.

The company's first announced product was the PCM-12, a 12-bit minicomputer. The IM6100 allows it to be mostly software compatible with Digital Equipment Corporation's PDP-8/E. The PCM-12 supported up to 32 kilowords of memory 12 bits wide, and its 80-line bus accommodated 15 expansion cards. On release, the only expansion cards optioned were device-interfacing modules—including TTY and cassette—and memory boards; a direct memory access controller card and a hardware vectored interrupt handler card were provisional. Included with the stock PCM-12 was a 4-kiloword memory board. The minicomputer's front panel meanwhile provides virtually all of the PDP-8/E's switch-functions while also including binary bootstrap loader and decrement-address functions. On release in early 1976, the PCM-12 was only available in kit form for between US$400 and $600, depending on options. By mid-March that year, the price of the kit increased to $799. The kit in minimal form required assembling the computer from five printed circuit boards (including the CPU and 4-kiloword memory boards), the cabinet, the front panel, and the power supply. The computer was later offered completely assembled and tested in May 1976, for $1224. The PCM-12 was, by Byte magazine's estimation, the first mini- or microcomputer based on the IM6100. According to Modern Data, the computer was also the first to have its backplane and cards built into a metal card cage.

The PCM-12 received a facelift in the form of the PCM-12A in mid-1977. This revision "beefed-up" the original PCM-12's included literature and cabinetry, added a crystal oscillator to the CPU board to generate a timing signal for variable baud rates, an "absolute loader" that bootstraps binary from tape directly into any field of memory, and a floppy disk controller card—the latter allowing DEC's OS/8 operating system to be run on the PCM-12. The kit price remained $799, later decreased to $679 (against the assembled version's $989). The portfolio of expansion cards by this point included a parallel–serial I/O card and a DEC-compatible, high-speed punched card reader–writer. PC/M backported floppy disk functionality to the original PCM-12 with the 12440, a dual-floppy controller card introduced in November 1977. This card sold for $259 assembled and $169 as an unsoldered kit.

PC/M released myriad expansion cards in the turn of 1978, including three memory expansion cards, a power-fail module card, an improved TTY card, and a PDP-8 emulation card. The three memory cards comprised the 12020A, the PCM-12's basic 12-bit 4-kiloword n-channel RAM board; the 12160, a ROM/RAM hybrid board constituting 1.5 kilowords of UV-erasable EPROMs in high pages and 512 words of n-channel RAM in low pages; and the 12210, a 12-bit 4-kiloword non-volatile CMOS RAM board. The 12210 stored memory after power-off for up to 30 days with the aid of its included battery. All three memory cards carry 59 integrated circuits, including logic chips for bus interfacing. The 12230 power-fail module was available around the time of release of these memory cards, which when paired with the 12210 made the PCM-12 impervious to AC power failures. The improved TTY card, named the 12060, emulated DEC's 03 and 04 device selector designations and provides I/O with both RS-232 and 20-mA current loop interfaces. The 12060 supports both teleprinters and video terminals. PC/M co-introduced the 12060 with the 12310, a digital I/O board which provides the PCM-12 with additional instruction sets based on DEC's DR8-EA Flip-Chip module, which aided in the fields of data acquisition and process control. Aiming to attract third-party vendors for development of custom expansion cards for the PCM-12, the company released the 12090 prototype board, a double-plated through-hole circuit board with a grid of vias to facilitate wire-wrap or solder tail connections.

The company entered the CMOS EPROM programmer industry with the release of the Model 66 in February 1978. Compatible only with Intersil's 6603 and 6604 EPROM chips, Model 66 can be used standalone or controlled via a computer, terminal, teletype, or IC test equipment for automated burning. Inside the Model 66 is a microprocessor and a 4-KiB RAM buffer. It offers a full suite of editing functions, including loading and monitoring the RAM buffer or the EPROM directly, with a button on the front panel allowing the user to verify quickly if the EPROM has been erased; while firmware in ROM provides dumping and verifying capabilities to external control. Operated standalone, EPROM data may be loaded by paper tape. The Model 66 was later tweaked as the Model 660 in August 1978.

PC/M moved its headquarters in late 1979 to Dublin, California, where the company spent the remainder of its existence in a 6,000-square-foot facility. The company's workforce was relatively spartan throughout its lifespan, employing only "about 10" in 1979, later increasing to 15 by the early 2000s. Also in 1979, the company opened up Bubbl-Tec, a division dedicated to development and manufacturing of devices using bubble memory modules fabricated by Texas Instruments. The opening of this division, which PC/M anticipated would generate the bulk of the company's future growth overall, necessitated the company move headquarters from San Ramon to Dublin. Originally sold only via direct sales, PC/M signed up distributors in the United States and Europe and hired in-house company salespeople to sell Bubbl-Tec's products later in 1979. The company delivered its first bubble-memory-based device in July 1979; two more were added to Bubbl-Tec's roster in September.

=== 1980s ===
A physically larger follow-up to the PCM-12 was introduced in early 1980. Described by Computer Business News as a mainframe, the PCM-12 Omega offered 18 expansion slots on its bus and added a hinge to its card cage, allowing it to pivot up into view of the user from the front panel and stay into place through a special mechanism. Still based on the Intersil 6100, PC/M ensured software compatibility with the PDP-8/A (the last non-microprocessor-based incarnation of the PDP-8), the VT78 DECstation, and the WS78 and WD78 word–data processing systems. The expansion slots are variably spaced to allow for both narrow cards such as memory modules and wire-wrapped prototype boards which require far more clearance. The built-in power supply provides overvoltage protection and foldback current limiting.

Shortly after the PCM-12, PC/M released a single-board computer, the Model PPS-1201, designed to be plugged into Intel's Multibus backplane. Based again on the Intersil 6100, the PPS-1201 supports up to 4 kilowords of socketed memory chips configurable as any amount of RAM or EPROMs. An additional kiloword of memory on the board is reserved for loading and running a "control panel" suite, comprising a debugger and a machine code monitor, from an on-board ROM. The board also possesses a memory expansion controller, a serial port compatible with RS-232 and 20-mA current loop interfaces (through the use of an on-board optocoupler), and three 12-bit-wide parallel ports. The PPS-1201 was followed up in 1981 by the simply titled Model PPS-12, which had essentially the same board layout but added support for other PC/M-manufactured serial–parallel and bubble memory expansion modules as well as added software for terminal control and external software development equipment interfacing. The PPS-12 was designed for field applications where only battery or solar power is available; it requires only a 5 V hookup and consumes only half a watt of power.

PC/M's Bubbl-Tec division continued releasing memory cards until at least 1987, their efforts culminating in the PCH-3 Bubbl-Board, a bubble memory expansion card for IBM PC and compatibles. The card supported up to 1.5 MB worth of bubble memory modules, which were removable and could be loaded into Bubbl-Pacs enclosures for the Bubbl-Dek—an external bubble memory module reader developed by Bubble-Tec that plugs into the disk drive bay of the PC.

In 1988, the company introduced a $20,300 Unix-compatible multiprocessor computer system for Motorola's VMEbus, called Hyperflo. Each processor board carries four Motorola 68020 CPUs and two floating-point units standard. Apart from the processor boards, the package includes a resource management board, a memory controller board, and one or more flat memory boards. An optional ROM board allows software to be stored and loaded instantaneously. The system supports up to eighteen processor boards.

=== 1990s – 2001 ===
Pacific Cyber/Metrix's domain in the 1990s was largely limited to VMEbus-based digital signal processors for imaging, signal analysis, and scientific instrumentation. In 1996, the company renamed themselves to PCM Systems. In November 2001, the company filed its certificate of dissolution to the California government.
