= Intersil ICL8038 =

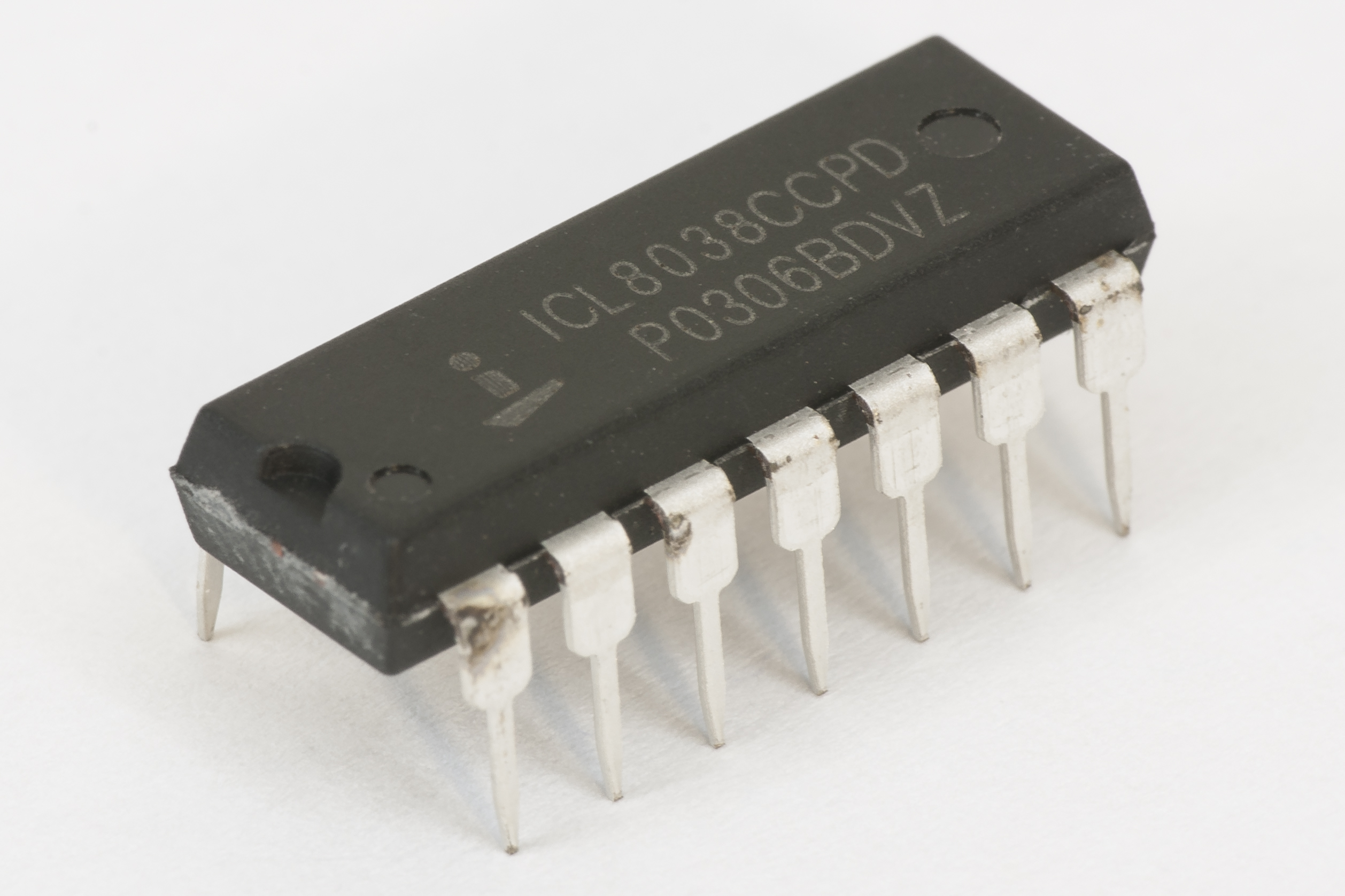
Intersil ICL8038

ICL8038 operation (simplified; sine wave is derived from the triangular wave)

The ICL8038 waveform generator was an Integrated circuit by Intersil designed to generate sine, square and triangular waveforms, based on bipolar monolithic technology involving Schottky barrier diodes. ICL8038 was a voltage-controlled oscillator capable of producing frequencies between a millihertz and 100 kHz., some specimens capable of reaching 300 kHz. The device has been discontinued by Intersil in 2002.

Triangular waves were produced by charging and discharging a capacitor with constant currents. The triangular waves were converted to sine waves involving a non-linear network. The output frequency was set either by resistors or the external control voltage. The temperature drift could be optimized to less than 250ppm/°C by combining it with a PLL.

Maxim designed a copy of the ICL8038 and marketed it as the MAX038. Both devices have since been discontinued.

== See also ==
- 555 timer IC
