= PDP-8 =

Minicomputer product line

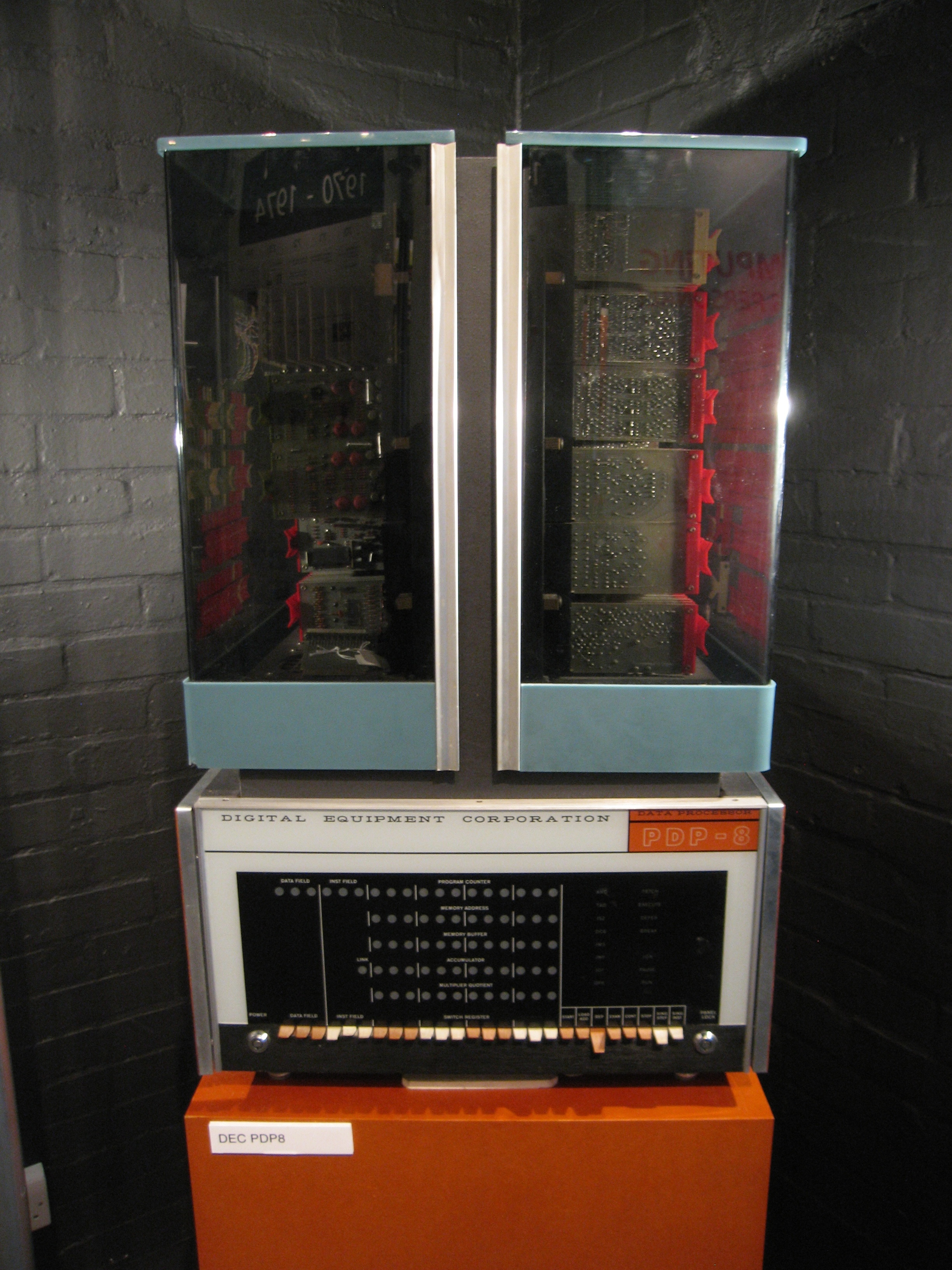
- A PDP-8 on display at The National Museum of Computing in Bletchley, England. This example is from the first generation of PDP-8s, built with discrete transistors and later known as the Straight 8.
- Developer: Digital Equipment Corporation
- Product family: Programmed Data Processor
- Type: Minicomputer
- Released: March 22, 1965; 61 years ago
- Introductory price: US$18,500, equivalent to about $189,000 in 2025
- Units sold: 50,000+
- Platform: PDP 12-bit
- Predecessor: PDP-5
- Successor: PDP-12

The PDP-8 is a family of 12-bit minicomputers that was produced by Digital Equipment Corporation (DEC). Launched in 1965, it was the first minicomputer to sell for under $20,000, and the $25,000 mark for a complete system would later be a defining characteristic of the minicomputer class. Over 50,000 units were sold during the model's lifetime.

Its basic design follows the pioneering LINC but has a smaller instruction set, which is an expanded version of the PDP-5 instruction set. To lower the cost of implementation, the system leaves out a number of commonly used functions which have to be written using combinations of other instructions. This leads to complex programs.

The PDP-12 is an offshoot of the PDP-8 with a processor that can run programs for the PDP-8 and LINC systems. The successor to the PDP-8 line is the PDP-11, which featured a more complete instruction set and was not backward compatible.

== Overview ==
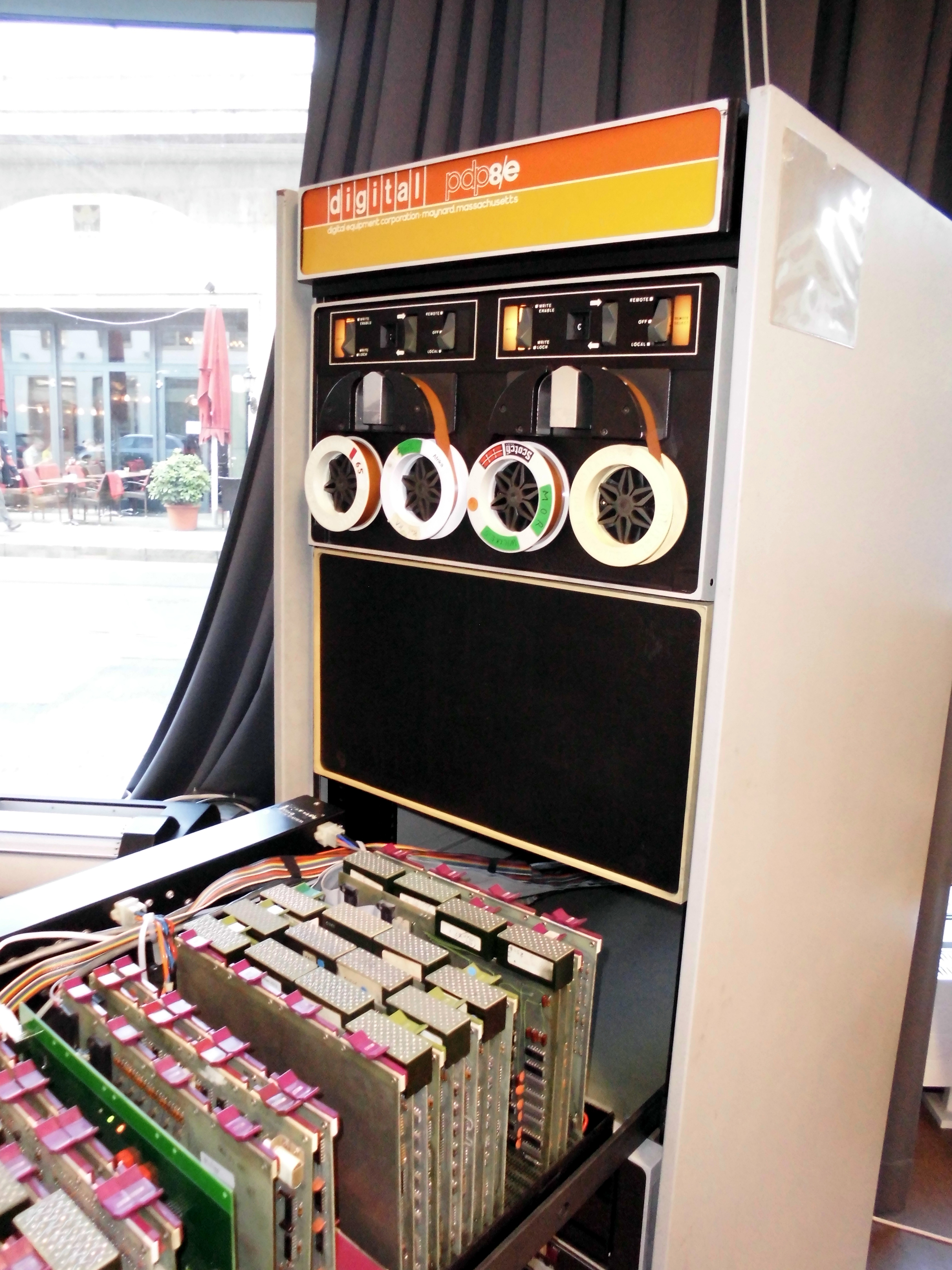
An open PDP-8/E with its logic modules behind the front panel and one dual TU56 DECtape drive at the top

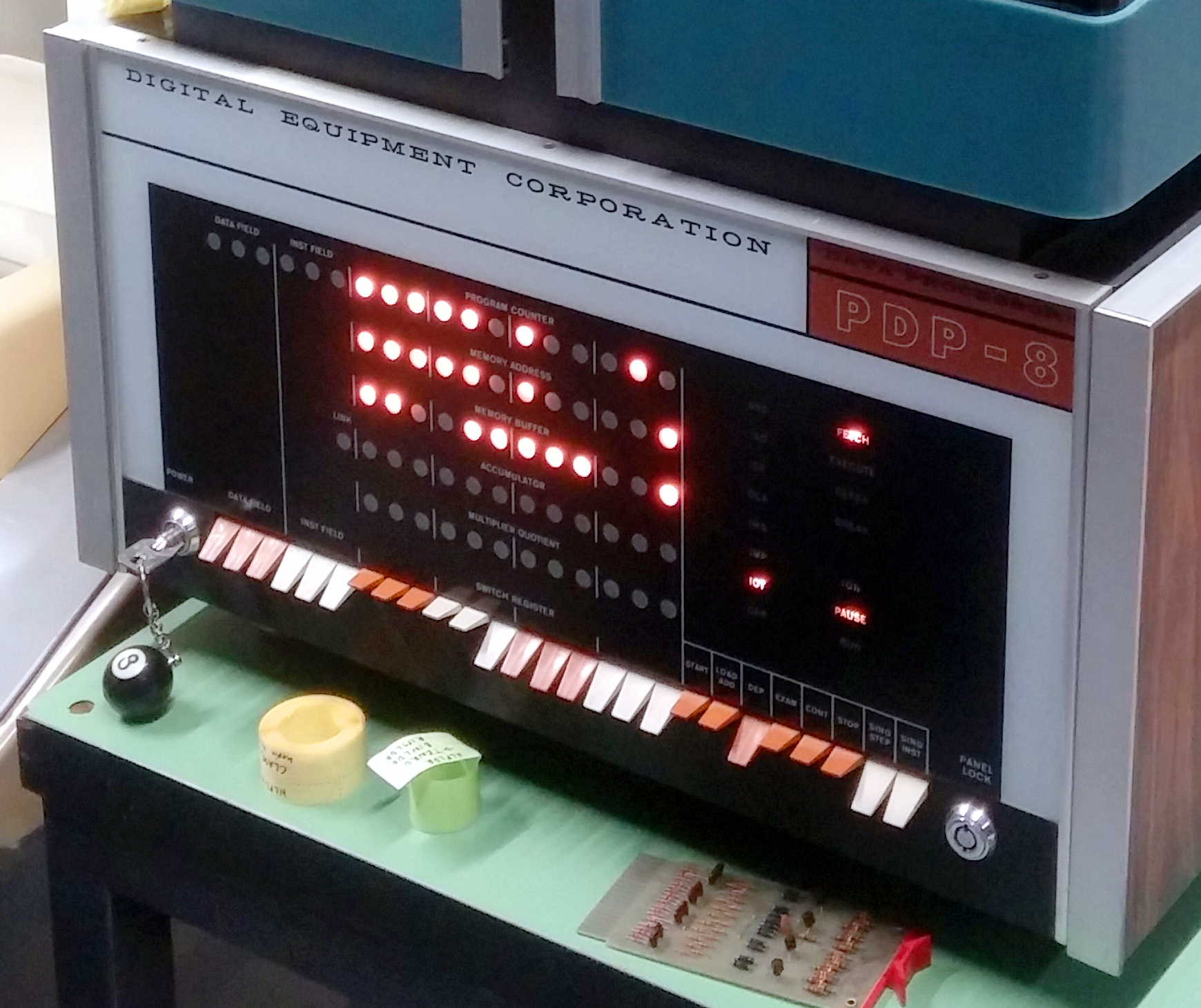
A "Straight-8" running at the Stuttgart Computer Museum

The earliest PDP-8 model, later informally known as a "Straight-8", was introduced on 22 March 1965 priced at $18,500 (equivalent to about $189,000 in 2025). It uses diode–transistor logic packaged on flip chip cards in a machine about the size of a small household refrigerator. It was the first computer to be sold for under $20,000, making it the best-selling computer in history at that time.

The Straight-8 was supplanted in 1966 by the PDP-8/S, which was available in desktop and rack-mount models. Using a one-bit serial arithmetic logic unit (ALU) allowed the PDP-8/S to be smaller and less expensive, although slower than the original PDP-8. A basic 8/S sold for under $10,000, the first machine to reach that milestone.

Later systems (the PDP-8/I and /L, the PDP-8/E, /F, and /M, and the PDP-8/A) returned to a faster, fully parallel implementation but use less costly transistor–transistor logic (TTL) MSI logic. Most surviving PDP-8s are from this era. The PDP-8/E is common, and well-regarded because many types of I/O devices were available for it.

The last commercial PDP-8 models introduced in 1979 are called "CMOS-8s", based on CMOS microprocessors. They were not priced competitively, and the offering failed. Intersil sold the integrated circuits commercially through 1982 as the Intersil 6100 family. By virtue of their CMOS technology they had low power requirements and were used in some embedded military systems.

The chief engineer who designed the initial version of the PDP-8 was Edson de Castro, who later founded Data General.

== Architectural significance ==
The PDP-8 combined low cost, simplicity, and expandability, and made computing feasible for new users and new tasks. It now serves as a historical example of value-engineered computer design.

The low complexity brought other costs. It made programming cumbersome, as is seen in the examples in this article and from the discussion of "pages" and "fields". Much of one's code performed the required mechanics, as opposed to setting out the algorithm. For example, subtracting a number from another number requires computing the two's complement of the first number and then adding the second number, as there is no subtract instruction; and performing a conditional jump involves performing a conditional skip around an unconditional jump, with the skip condition being the negation to the one desired for the jump, as there are no conditional jump instructions. Some ambitious programming projects failed to fit in memory or developed design defects that could not be solved. For example, as noted below, inadvertent recursion of a subroutine produces defects that are difficult to trace to the subroutine in question.

As design advances reduced the costs of logic and memory, the programmer's time became relatively more important. Subsequent computer designs emphasized ease of programming, typically using larger and more intuitive instruction sets.

Eventually, most machine code was generated by compilers and report generators. The reduced instruction set computer returned full-circle to the PDP-8's emphasis on a simple instruction set and achieving multiple actions in a single instruction cycle, in order to maximize execution speed, although the newer computers have longer instruction words.

== Description ==
PDP-8 registers
^{1}_{1}	^{1}_{0}	_{9}	_{8}	_{7}	_{6}	_{5}	_{4}	_{3}	_{2}	_{1}	_{0}	(bit position)
Main registers
AC												ACcumulator
MQ												Multiplier Quotient
Program counter
PC												Program Counter
Status flags
											L	Link register

The PDP-8's predecessor was the PDP-5. It also used ideas from several 12-bit predecessors such as the LINC designed by W.A. Clark and C.E. Molnar, who were inspired by Seymour Cray's CDC 160 minicomputer. The LINC had been designed specifically to be easily interfaced with laboratory equipment, and the PDP-5 and PDP-8 included similar features.

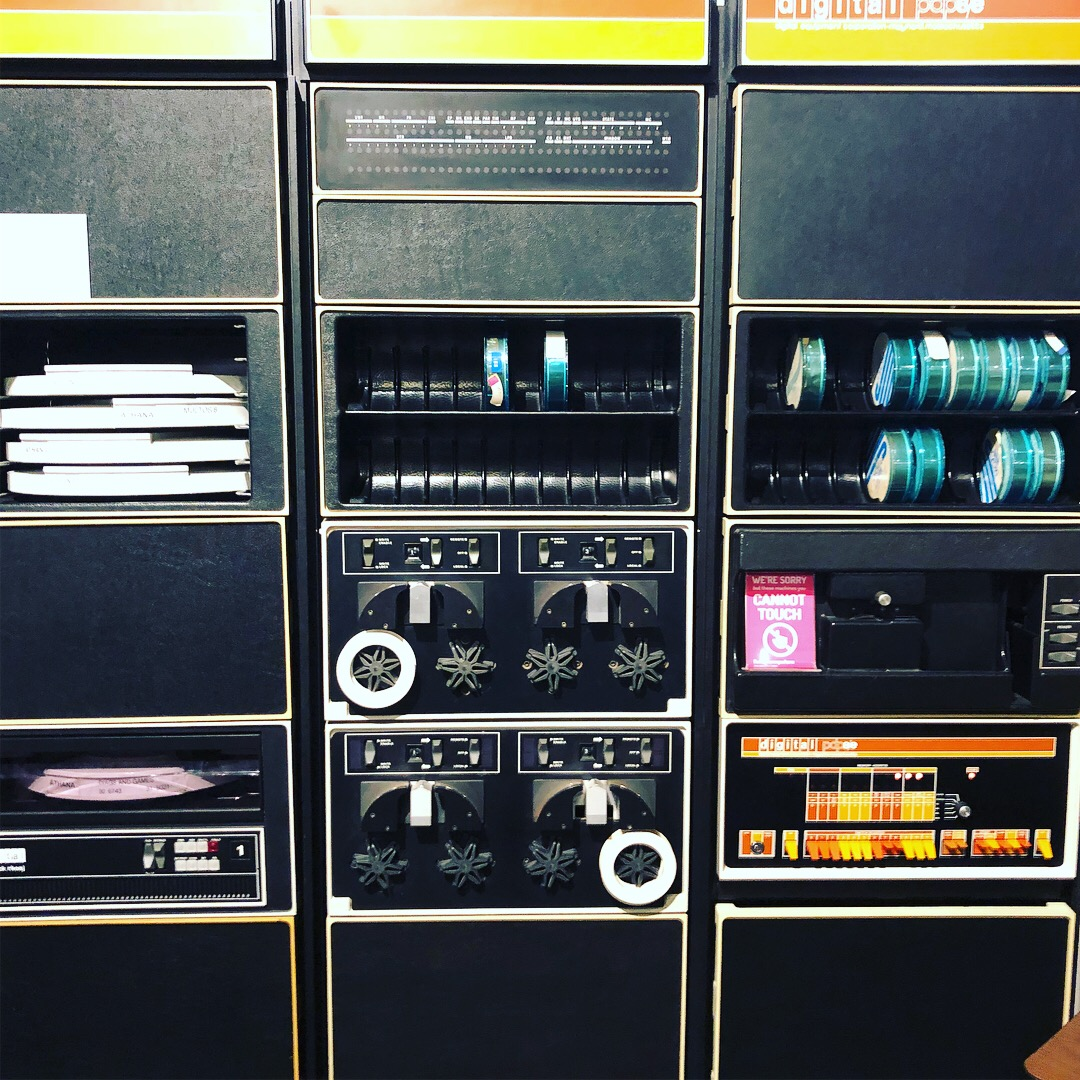
PDP-8/e at the Living Computers Museum

The PDP-8 uses 12 bits for its word size and arithmetic, meaning that internally it can work with unsigned integers from 0 to 4095 or signed integers from −2048 to +2047. To support working with larger numbers and floating point values, an interpreter was used that stored a single value with a two-word, 24-bit, significand (mantissa) and a one-word, 12-bit, exponent. Although using this format was slow, it allowed the PDP-8 to perform the same sorts of programs as more expensive machines like the IBM 1130 and IBM System/360, while being easier to interface with external devices.

The memory address space is also 12 bits, so the PDP-8's basic configuration has a maximum main memory of 4,096 (2^{12}) twelve-bit words, or 6 KiB in modern terms. An optional memory-expansion unit can switch banks of memories using an IOT instruction. The memory is magnetic-core memory with a cycle time of 1.5 microseconds (0.667 MHz), so that a typical two-cycle (Fetch, Execute) memory-reference instruction runs at a speed of 0.333 MIPS. The 1974 Pocket Reference Card for the PDP-8/E gives a basic instruction time of 1.2 microseconds, or 2.6 microseconds for instructions that reference memory.

The PDP-8 was designed in part to handle contemporary telecommunications and text. Six-bit character codes were in widespread use at the time, and the PDP-8's twelve-bit words can efficiently store two such characters. In addition, a six-bit teleprinter code called the teletypesetting or TTS code was in widespread use by the news wire services, and an early application for the PDP-8 was typesetting using this code.

PDP-8 instructions have a three-bit opcode, so there are only eight major instructions. The programmer can use many additional instruction mnemonics, which the assembler translates to specific OPR or IOT instructions. The PDP-8 has only three programmer-visible registers: the 12-bit accumulator (AC), 12-bit program counter (PC), and a single-bit carry flag called the "link register" (L). Additional registers not visible to the programmer are a memory-buffer register and a memory-address register. To save money, these serve multiple purposes at different points in the operating cycle. For example, the memory buffer register provides arithmetic operands, is part of the instruction register, and stores data to rewrite the core memory, which is erased when read.

For input and output, the PDP-8 has a single interrupt shared by all devices, an I/O bus accessed by I/O instructions and a direct memory access (DMA) channel. The programmed I/O bus typically runs low to medium-speed peripherals, such as printers, teletypes, paper tape punches and readers, while DMA is used for cathode-ray tube screens with a light pen, analog-to-digital converters, digital-to-analog converters, tape drives, and disk drives.

To save money, the design uses inexpensive main memory for many purposes that are served by more expensive flip-flop registers in other computers, such as auxiliary counters and subroutine linkage.

Basic models use software to do multiplication and division. For faster math, the Extended Arithmetic Element (EAE) provides multiply and divide instructions with an additional register, the Multiplier/Quotient (MQ) register. The EAE was an option on the original PDP-8, the 8/I, and the 8/E, but it is an integral part of the Intersil 6100 microprocessor, a single-chip implementation of the PDP-8.

The PDP-8 is optimized for simplicity of design. Compared to more complex machines, unnecessary features were removed and logic is shared when possible. Instructions use autoincrement, autoclear, and indirect access to increase the software's speed, reduce memory use, and substitute inexpensive memory for expensive registers.

Because of their simplicity, early PDP-8 models were less expensive than most other commercially available computers. As with contemporaneous machines from IBM and Burroughs, Digital used semi-automated wire-wrap technology to wire the backplanes of early PDP-8 models. The original PDP-8 CPU, excluding the extended arithmetic element and other options, required 75 small modules and 25 double-size modules, all but 2 from the R series Flip-Chip module family.

The PDP-8/S model, introduced in August 1966, also used mostly R-series Flip-Chip modules, but reduced the number of logic gates by using a serial, single-bit-wide data path to do arithmetic. The CPU of the PDP-8/S has only about 519 logic gates. In comparison, small microcontrollers (as of 2008) usually have 15,000 or more. The reductions in the electronics permitted a smaller case, about the size of a bread-box. The 8/S was designed by Saul Dinman.

The PDP-8/E is a larger, more capable computer, but further reengineered for better value. It employs faster transistor–transistor logic, in integrated circuits. The core memory was redesigned. It allows expansion with less expense because it uses the OMNIBUS in place of the wire-wrapped backplane on earlier models. (A personal account of the development of the PDP-8/E can be read on the Engineering and Technology History Wiki.)

== Models ==
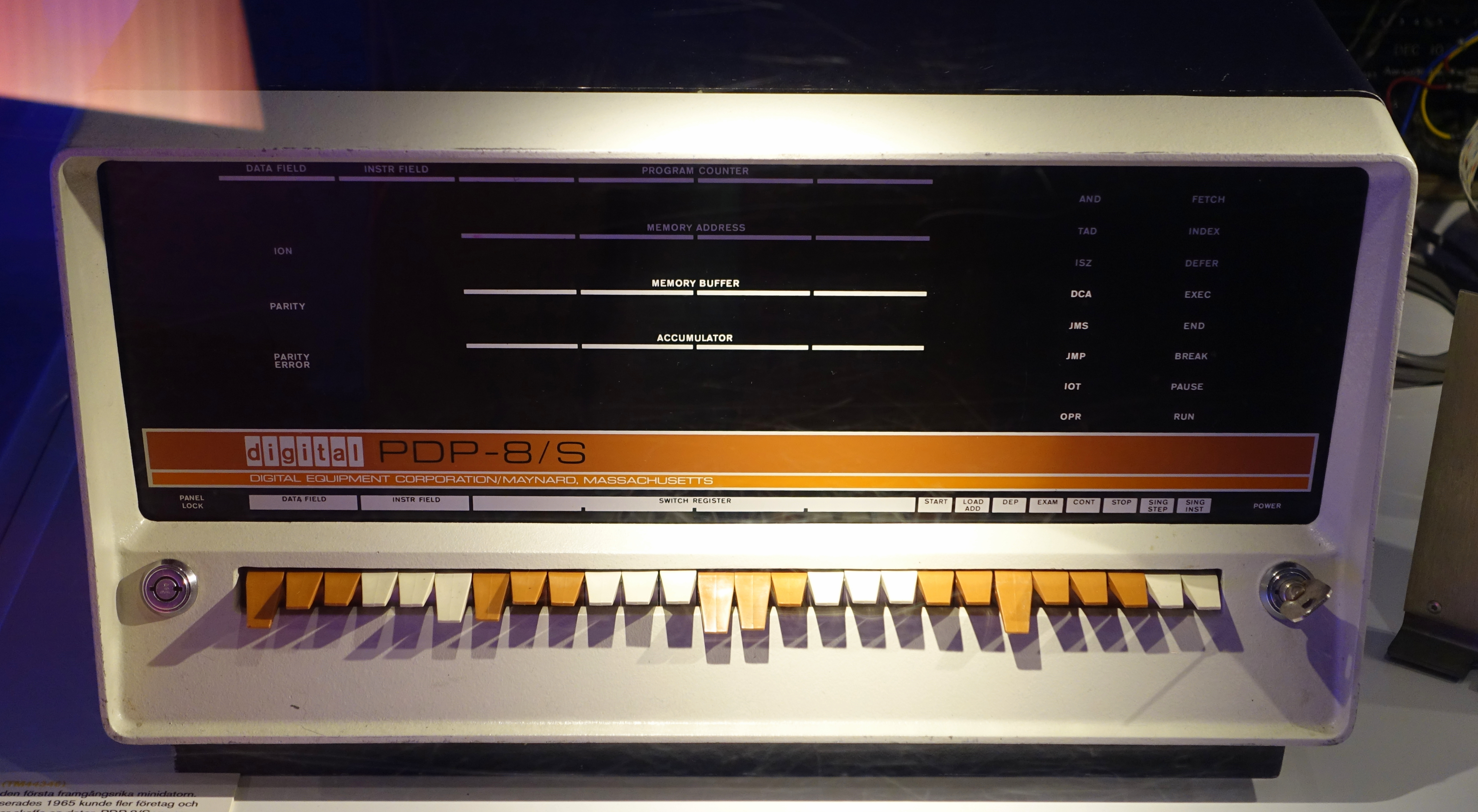
PDP-8/S front panel

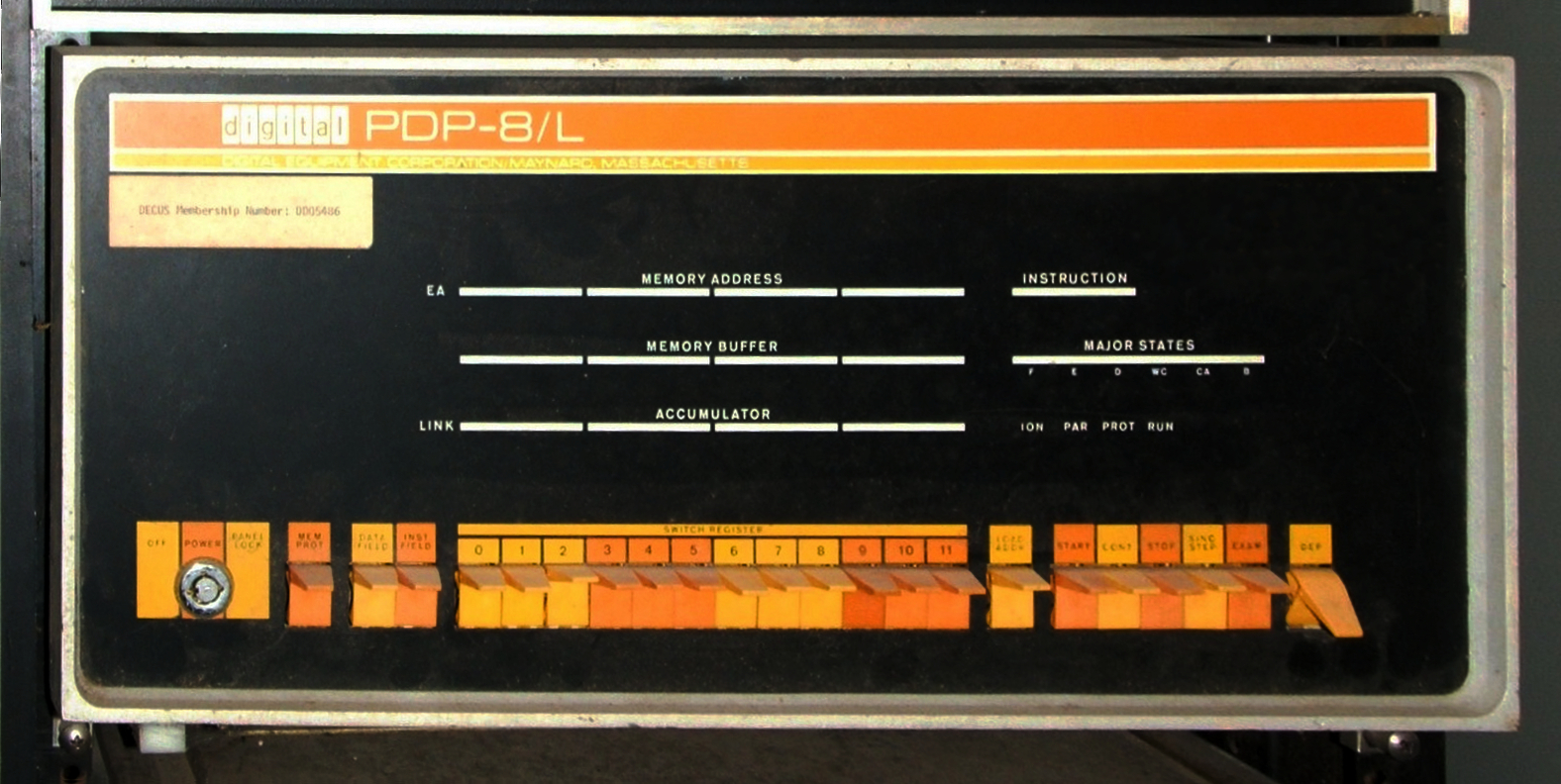
PDP-8/L front panel

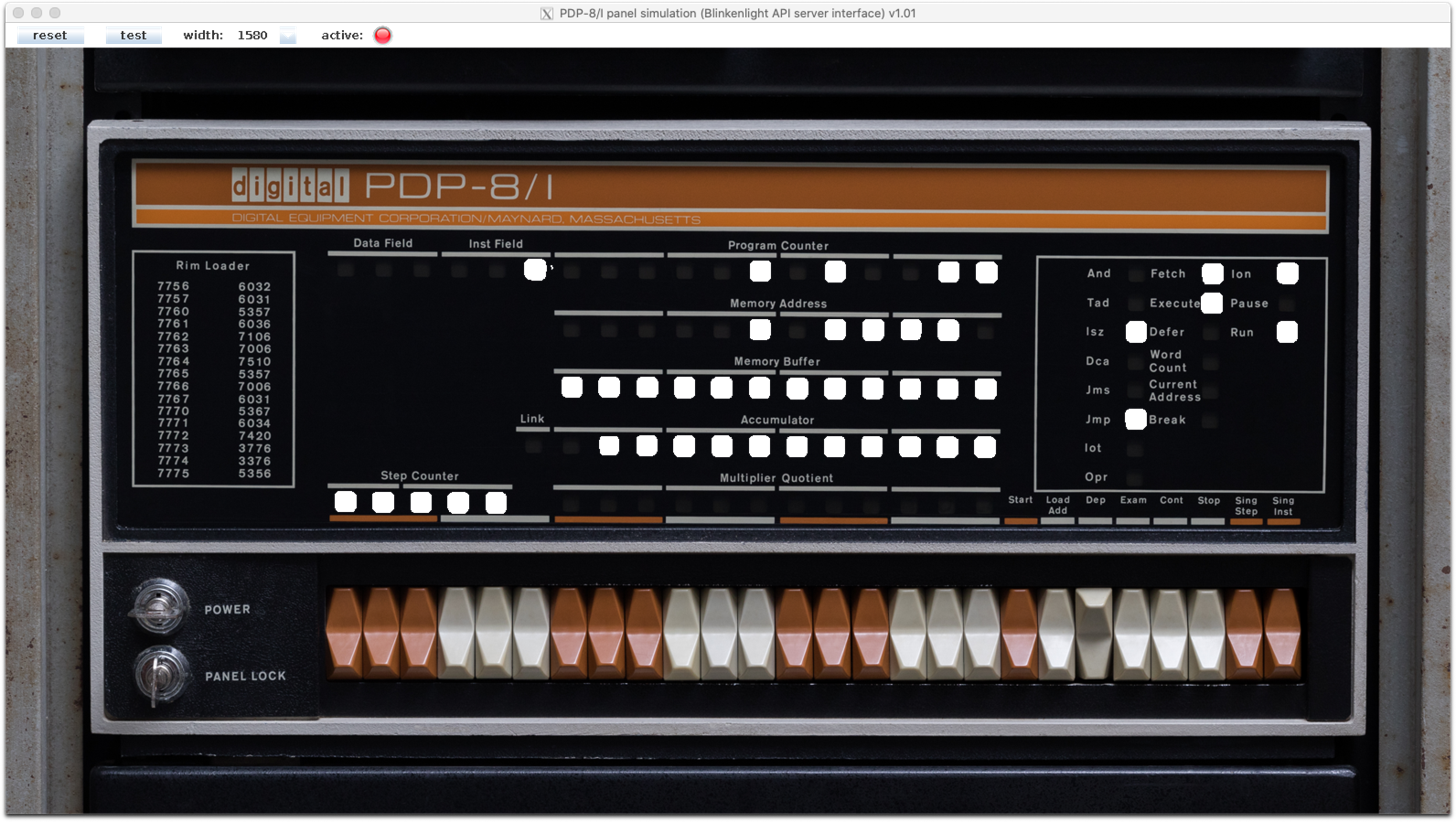
PDP-8/I front panel

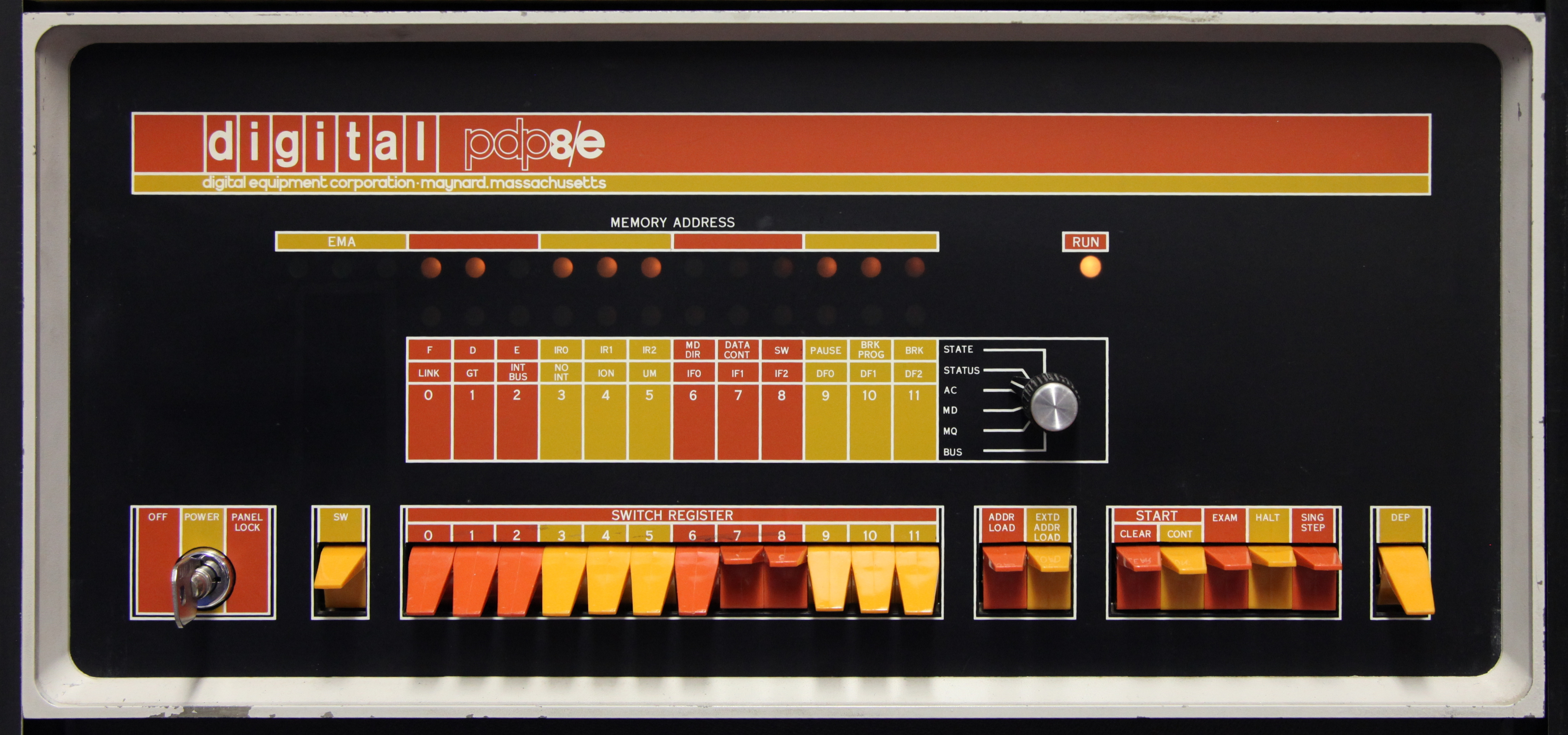
PDP-8/E front panel

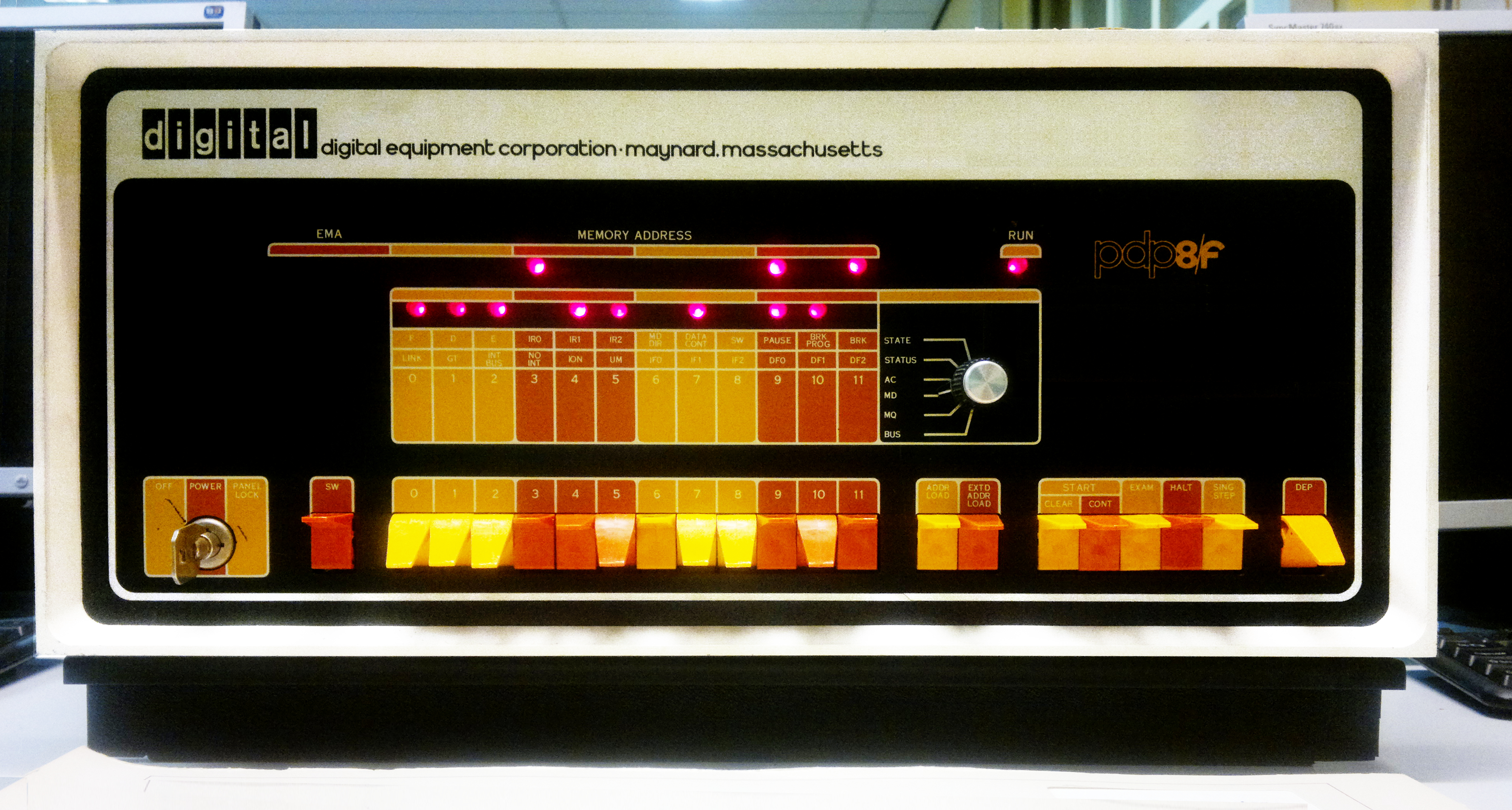
PDP-8/F front panel

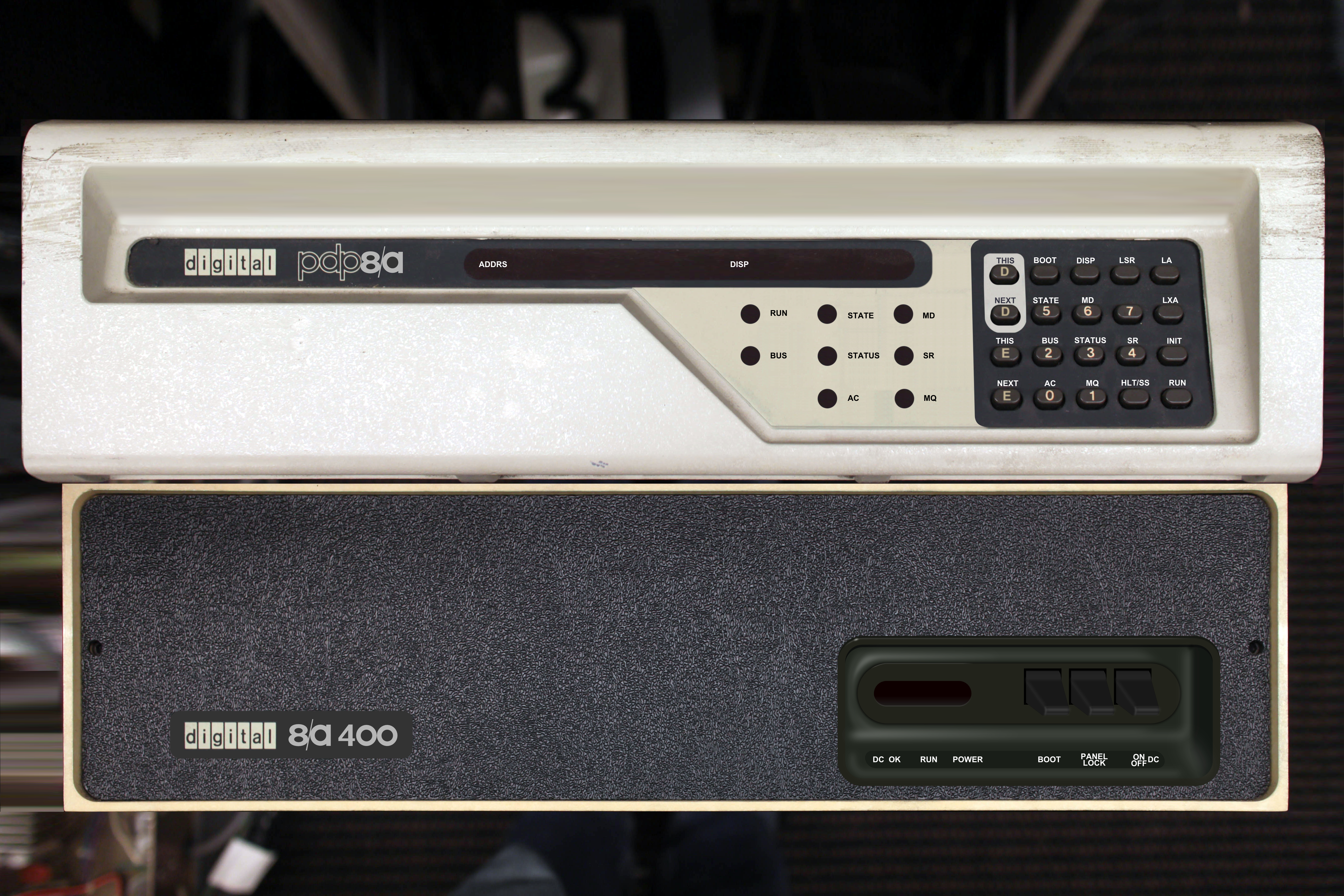
PDP-8/A 400 front panel

The total sales figure for the PDP-8 family has been estimated at over 300,000 machines. The following models were manufactured:

PDP-8 models summary
Model	Description	Year	Price	Quantity produced	Weight
PDP-8	Semi-discrete components. Used some hybrid ICs. DTL.	1965	$18,000	1450	250 pounds (113 kg)
LINC-8	Could run either LINC or PDP-8 code	1966	$38,500	142	
PDP-8/S	Lower-cost serial version of the PDP-8	1966	$10,000	1024	84 pounds (38 kg)
PDP-8/I	First PDP-8 made out of standard TTL ICs	1968	$12,800	3698	250 pounds (110 kg)
PDP-8/L	Lower-cost counterpart to the PDP-8/I	1968	$8,500	3902	80 pounds (36 kg)
PDP-12	A PDP-8/I with support for LINC instructions (replaced the LINC-8)	1969	$27,900	755	
PDP-8/E	Fewer, larger boards to improve price and efficiency	1970	$6,500		90 pounds (41 kg) (typical)
PDP-8/F	Lower-cost counterpart to the PDP-8/E	1972			57 pounds (26 kg) (typical)
PDP-8/M	An OEM PDP-8/F with altered front panel	1972	$5,000		57 pounds (26 kg) (typical)
PDP-8/A	LSI logic allowed the CPU to fit on a single board	1974	$1,835		
Intersil 6100	Single-chip PDP-8-compatible microprocessor (used in the VT78)	1975			
Harris 6120	CMOS single-chip PDP-8-compatible microprocessor (used in the DECmate word processors)	1976			

=== Latter-day implementations ===
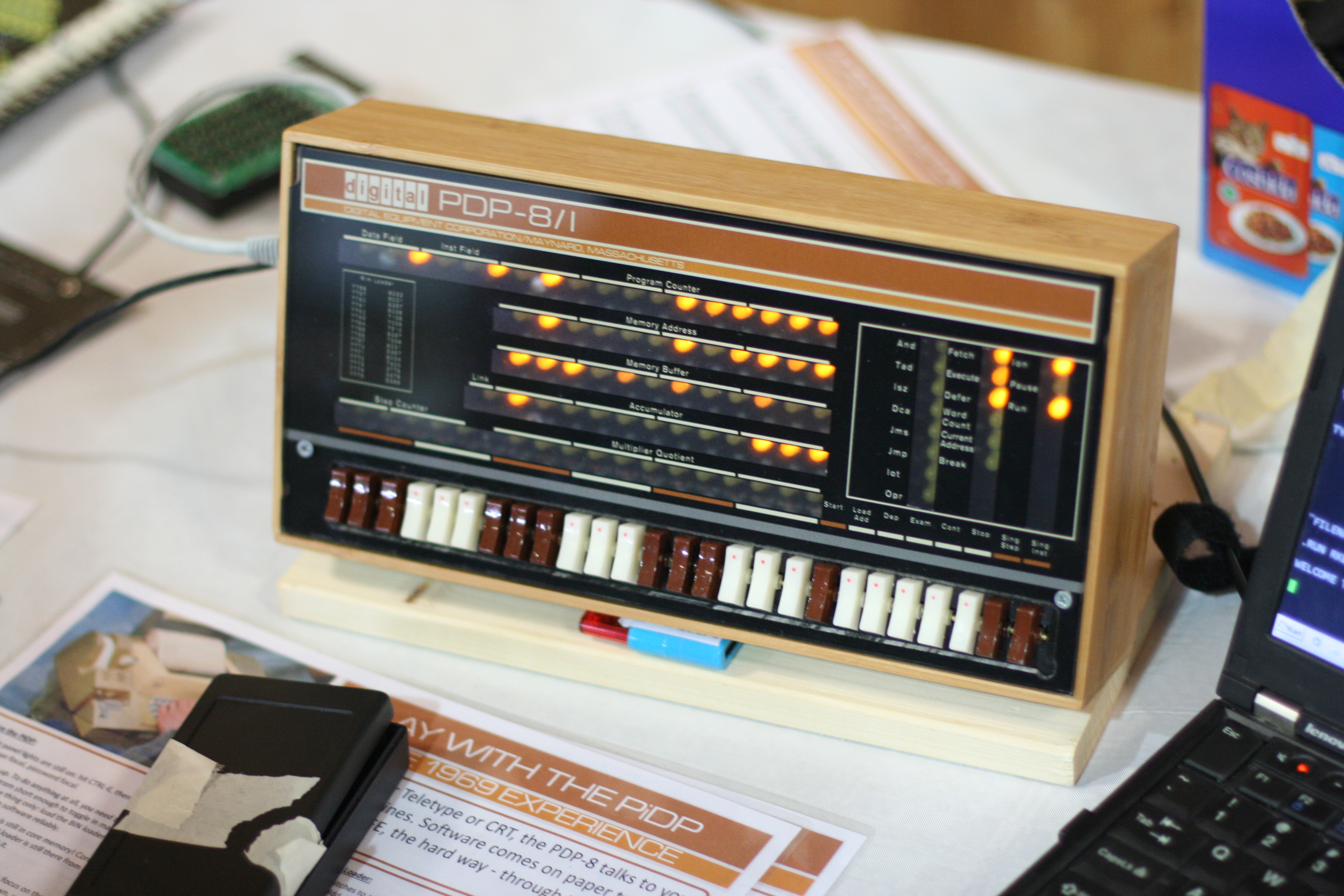
PiDP-8, a PDP-8/I replica based on a Raspberry Pi

Due in part to its simplicity, PDP-8 is readily emulated.

Several software simulations of a PDP-8 are available on the Internet, as well as open-source hardware re-implementations. The best of these correctly execute DEC's operating systems and diagnostic software. The software simulations often simulate late-model PDP-8s with all possible peripherals. Even these use only a tiny fraction of the capacity of a modern personal computer.

Enthusiasts have created entire PDP-8s using single FPGA devices.

== Input/output ==
The I/O systems underwent huge changes during the PDP-8 era. Early PDP-8 models use a front panel interface, a paper-tape reader and a teletype printer with an optional paper-tape punch. Over time, I/O systems such as magnetic tape, RS-232 and current loop dumb terminals, punched card readers, and fixed-head disks were added. Toward the end of the PDP-8 era, floppy disks and moving-head cartridge disk drives were popular I/O devices. Modern enthusiasts have created standard PC style IDE hard disk adapters for real and simulated PDP-8 computers.

Several types of I/O are supported:

- In-backplane dedicated slots for I/O controllers
- A "Negative" I/O bus (using negative voltage signalling)
- A "Positive" I/O bus (the same architecture using TTL signalling)
- The Omnibus (a backplane of undedicated system bus slots) introduced in the PDP-8/E. (Details are described in the referenced IEEE article listed below.)

A simplified, inexpensive form of DMA called "three-cycle data break" is supported; this requires the assistance of the processor. The "data break" method moves some of common logic needed to implement DMA I/O from each I/O device into one common copy of the logic within the processor. "Data break" places the processor in charge of maintaining the DMA address and word count registers. In three successive memory cycles, the processor updates the word count, updates the transfer address, and stores or retrieves the actual I/O data word.

One-cycle data break effectively triples the DMA transfer rate because only the target data needed to be transferred to and from the core memory. However, the I/O devices need more electronic logic to manage their own word count and transfer address registers. By the time the PDP-8/E was introduced, electronic logic had become less expensive and "one-cycle data break" became more popular.

== Programming facilities ==
Early PDP-8 systems were shipped with no pre-installed software; each time the PDP-8 was powered up, the user hand-entered instructions using a bank of 12 toggle switches. Typically, these instructions were a bootstrap loader to read a program from the paper tape reader of a Teletype Model 33. Program development could then proceed, using paper tape input and output.

Paper-tape versions of a number of programming languages became available, including DEC's FOCAL interpreter and a 4K FORTRAN compiler and runtime.

Toward the end of the PDP-8 era, operating systems such as OS/8 and COS-310 allowed a traditional line mode editor and command-line compiler development system using languages such as PAL-III assembly language, FORTRAN, BASIC, and DIBOL.

Fairly modern and advanced real-time operating system (RTOS) and preemptive multitasking multi-user systems were available: a real-time system (RTS-8) was available as were multiuser commercial systems (COS-300 and COS-310) and a dedicated single-user word-processing system (WPS-8).

A time-sharing system, TSS-8, was also available. TSS-8 allows multiple users to log into the system via 110-baud terminals, and edit, compile and debug programs. Languages include a special version of BASIC, a FORTRAN subset similar to FORTRAN-1 (no user-written subroutines or functions), an ALGOL subset, FOCAL, and an assembler called PAL-D.

A fair amount of user-donated software for the PDP-8 was available from DECUS, the Digital Equipment Corporation User Society, and often came with full source listings and documentation.

== Instruction set ==
The three high-order bits of the 12-bit instruction word (labelled bits 0 through 2) are the operation code. For the six operations that refer to memory, bits 5 through 11 provide a seven-bit address. Bit 4, if set, says to complete the address using the five high-order bits of the program counter (PC) register, meaning that the addressed location was within the same 128 words as the instruction. If bit 4 is clear, zeroes are used, so the addressed location is within the first 128 words of memory. Bit 3 specifies indirection; if set, the address obtained as described so far points to a 12-bit value in memory that gives the actual effective address for the instruction; this way, operands can be anywhere in memory at the expense of an additional word. The JMP instruction does not operate on a memory word, except if indirection is specified, but has the same bit fields.

0	2	3	4	5	11
Operation		I	Z	Offset

Memory pages

This use of the instruction word divides the 4,096-word memory into 128-word pages; bit 4 of the instruction selects either the current page or page 0 (addresses 0000–0177 in octal). Memory in page 0 is at a premium, since variables placed here can be addressed directly from any page. (Moreover, address 0000 is where any interrupt service routine must start, and addresses 0010–0017 have the special property of auto-incrementing preceding any indirect reference through them.)

The standard assembler places constant values for arithmetic in the current page. Likewise, cross-page jumps and subroutine calls use an indirect address in the current page.

It was important to write routines to fit within 128-word pages, or to arrange routines to minimize page transitions, as references and jumps outside the current page require an extra word. Consequently, much time was spent cleverly conserving one or several words. Programmers deliberately placed code at the end of a page to achieve a free transition to the next page as PC was incremented.

=== Basic instructions ===
000 – AND – Bitwise AND the memory operand with AC.
001 – TAD – Two's complement add the memory operand to <L, AC> (a 12 bit signed value (AC) w. carry in L).
010 – ISZ – Increment the memory operand and skip next instruction if result is zero.
011 – DCA – Deposit AC into the memory operand and clear AC.
100 – JMS – Jump to subroutine (storing return address in first word of subroutine).
101 – JMP – Jump.
110 – IOT – Input/output transfer (see below).
111 – OPR – Microcoded operations (see below).

=== IOT (Input-Output Transfer) instructions ===
The PDP-8 processor defined few of the IOT instructions, but simply provided a framework. Most IOT instructions were defined by the individual I/O devices.

0	2	3	8	9	11
6 = IOT		Device		Function

Device

Bits 3 through 8 of an IOT instruction select an I/O device. Some of these device addresses are standardized by convention:

- 00 is handled by the processor and not sent to any I/O device (see below).
- 01 is usually the high-speed paper tape reader.
- 02 is the high-speed paper tape punch.
- 03 is the console keyboard (and any associated low-speed paper tape reader).
- 04 is the console printer (and any associated low-speed paper tape punch).

Instructions for device 0 affect the processor as a whole. For example, ION (6001) enables interrupt processing, and IOFF (6002) disables it.

Function

Bits 9 through 11 of an IOT instruction select the function(s) the device performs. Simple devices (such as the paper tape reader and punch and the console keyboard and printer) use the bits in standard ways:

- Bit 11 causes the processor to skip the next instruction if the I/O device is ready.
- Bit 10 clears AC.
- Bit 9 moves a word between AC and the device, initiates another I/O transfer, and clears the device's "ready" flag.

These operations take place in a well-defined order that gives useful results if more than one bit is set.

More complicated devices, such as disk drives, use these 3 bits in device-specific fashions. Typically, a device decodes the 3 bits to give 8 possible function codes.

=== OPR (Operate) ===
Many operations are achieved using OPR, including most of the conditionals. OPR does not address a memory location; conditional execution is achieved by conditionally skipping the following instruction, which is typically a JMP.

The OPR instruction was said to be "microcoded." This did not mean what the word means today (that a lower-level program fetched and interpreted the OPR instruction), but meant that each bit of the instruction word specifies a certain action, and the programmer could achieve several actions in a single instruction cycle by setting multiple bits. In use, a programmer can write several instruction mnemonics alongside one another, and the assembler combines them with OR to devise the actual instruction word. Many I/O devices support "microcoded" IOT instructions.

Microcoded actions take place in a well-defined sequence designed to maximize the utility of many combinations.

The OPR instructions come in Groups. Bits 3, 8 and 11 identify the Group of an OPR instruction, so it is impossible to combine the microcoded actions from different groups.

One action (and corresponding bit) which is the same in all groups is bit 4, CLA. If set, the accumulator is cleared.

==== Group 1 ====
        00 01 02 03 04 05 06 07 08 09 10 11
        ___________________________________
       | 1| 1| 1| 0|  |  |  |  |  |  |  |  |
       |__|__|__|__|__|__|__|__|__|__|__|__|
                   |CLA   CMA   RAR   BSW
                       CLL   CML   RAL   IAC

    Execution order  1  1  2  2  4  4  4  3

7200 – CLA – Clear Accumulator
7100 – CLL – Clear the L Bit
7040 – CMA – Ones' Complement Accumulator
7020 – CML – Complement L Bit
7001 – IAC – Increment <L,AC>
7010 – RAR – Rotate <L,AC> Right
7004 – RAL – Rotate <L,AC> Left
7012 – RTR – Rotate <L,AC> Right Twice
7006 – RTL – Rotate <L,AC> Left Twice
7002 – BSW – Byte Swap 6-bit "bytes" (PDP 8/e and up)

In most cases, the operations are sequenced so that they can be combined in the most useful ways. For example, combining CLA (CLear Accumulator), CLL (CLear Link), and IAC (Increment ACcumulator) first clears the AC and Link, then increments the accumulator, leaving it set to 1. Adding RAL to the mix (so CLA CLL IAC RAL) causes the accumulator to be cleared, incremented, then rotated left, leaving it set to 2. In this way, small integer constants were placed in the accumulator with a single instruction.

The combination CMA IAC, which the assembler lets you abbreviate as CIA, produces the arithmetic inverse of AC: the twos-complement negation. Since there is no subtraction instruction, computing the difference requires negating the subtrahend before two's-complement addition (TAD).

A Group 1 OPR instruction that has none of the microprogrammed bits set performs no action. The programmer can write NOP (No Operation) to assemble such an instruction.

==== Group 2, Or Group ====
         00 01 02 03 04 05 06 07 08 09 10 11
        ___________________________________
       | 1| 1| 1| 1|  |  |  |  | 0|  |  | 0|
       |__|__|__|__|__|__|__|__|__|__|__|__|
                   |CLA   SZA      OSR
                       SMA   SNL      HLT

                     2  1  1  1     3  3

7600 – CLA – Clear AC
7500 – SMA – Skip on AC < 0 (or group)
7440 – SZA – Skip on AC = 0 (or group)
7420 – SNL – Skip on L ≠ 0 (or group)
7404 – OSR – Bitwise OR front-panel switches with AC
7402 – HLT – Halt

Three of the bits (CLA, OSR, HLT) perform actions if set. Another three bits (SMA, SZA, SNL) encode skip conditions; a skip is performed if any of the specified conditions are true. For example, "SMA SZA", opcode 7540, skips if AC ≤ 0.

A Group 2 OPR instruction that has none of the microprogrammed bits set is another No-Op instruction.

==== Group 2, And Group ====
         00 01 02 03 04 05 06 07 08 09 10 11
        ___________________________________
       | 1| 1| 1| 1|  |  |  |  | 1|  |  | 0|
       |__|__|__|__|__|__|__|__|__|__|__|__|
                   |CLA   SNA      OSR
                       SPA   SZL      HLT

                     2  1  1  1     3  2

7410 – SKP – Skip Unconditionally
7610 – CLA – Clear AC
7510 – SPA – Skip on AC ≥ 0 (and group)
7450 – SNA – Skip on AC ≠ 0 (and group)
7430 – SZL – Skip on L = 0 (and group)

When bit 8 is set, the Group 2 skip condition is inverted; the skip is not performed if any of the or group conditions are true. By De Morgan's laws, this means that the skip is performed if all of the specified inverted conditions are true. For example, "SPA SNA", opcode 7550, skips if AC > 0. If none of bits 5–7 are set, then the skip is unconditional.

The actions (CLA, OSR, HLT) are not affected by bit 8.

==== Group 3 ====
Unused bit combinations of OPR are defined as a third Group of microprogrammed actions mostly affecting the MQ (Multiplier/Quotient) register. The MQ register and the extended arithmetic element (EAE) instructions are optional and only exist when the EAE option was purchased.

        00 01 02 03 04 05 06 07 08 09 10 11
        ___________________________________
       | 1| 1| 1| 1|  |  |  |  |  |  |  | 1|
       |__|__|__|__|__|__|__|__|__|__|__|__|
                   |CLA   SCA   \_    _/
                   |   MQA   MQL  CODE

                     1* 2  2  2     3

7601 – CLA – Clear AC
7501 – MQA – Multiplier Quotient with AC (logical or MQ into AC)
7441 – SCA – Step counter load into AC
7421 – MQL – Multiplier Quotient Load (Transfer AC to MQ, clear AC)
7621 – CAM – CLA + MQL clears both AC and MQ.

Typically CLA and MQA were combined to transfer MQ into AC. Another useful combination is MQA and MQL, to exchange the two registers.

Three bits specified a multiply/divide instruction to perform:

7401 – No operation
7403 – SCL – Step Counter Load (immediate word follows, PDP-8/I and up)
7405 – MUY – Multiply
7407 – DVI – Divide
7411 – NMI – Normalize
7413 – SHL – Shift left (immediate word follows)
7415 – ASR – Arithmetic shift right
7417 – LSR – Logical shift right

== Memory control ==
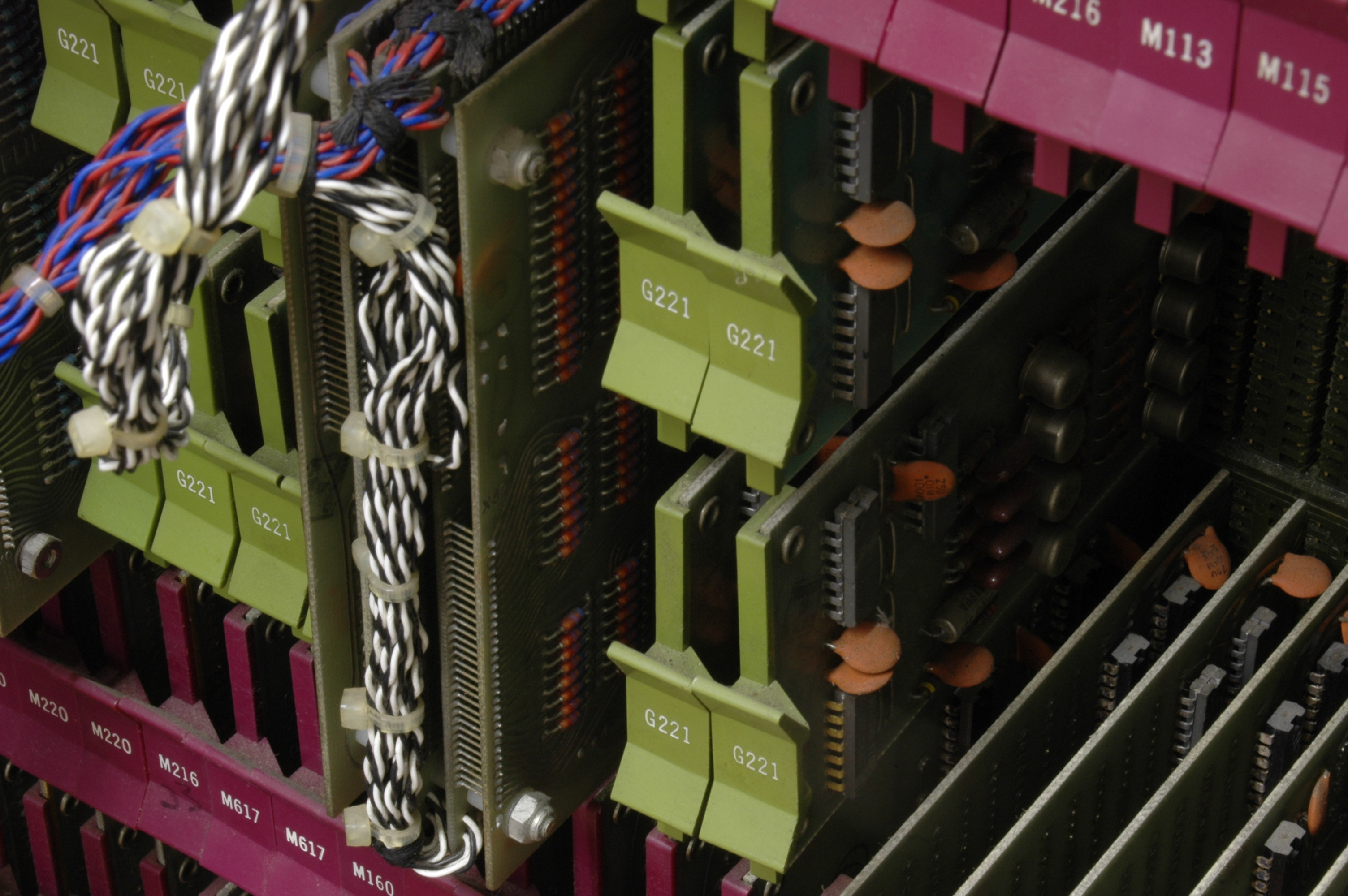
PDP-8/I core memory stack

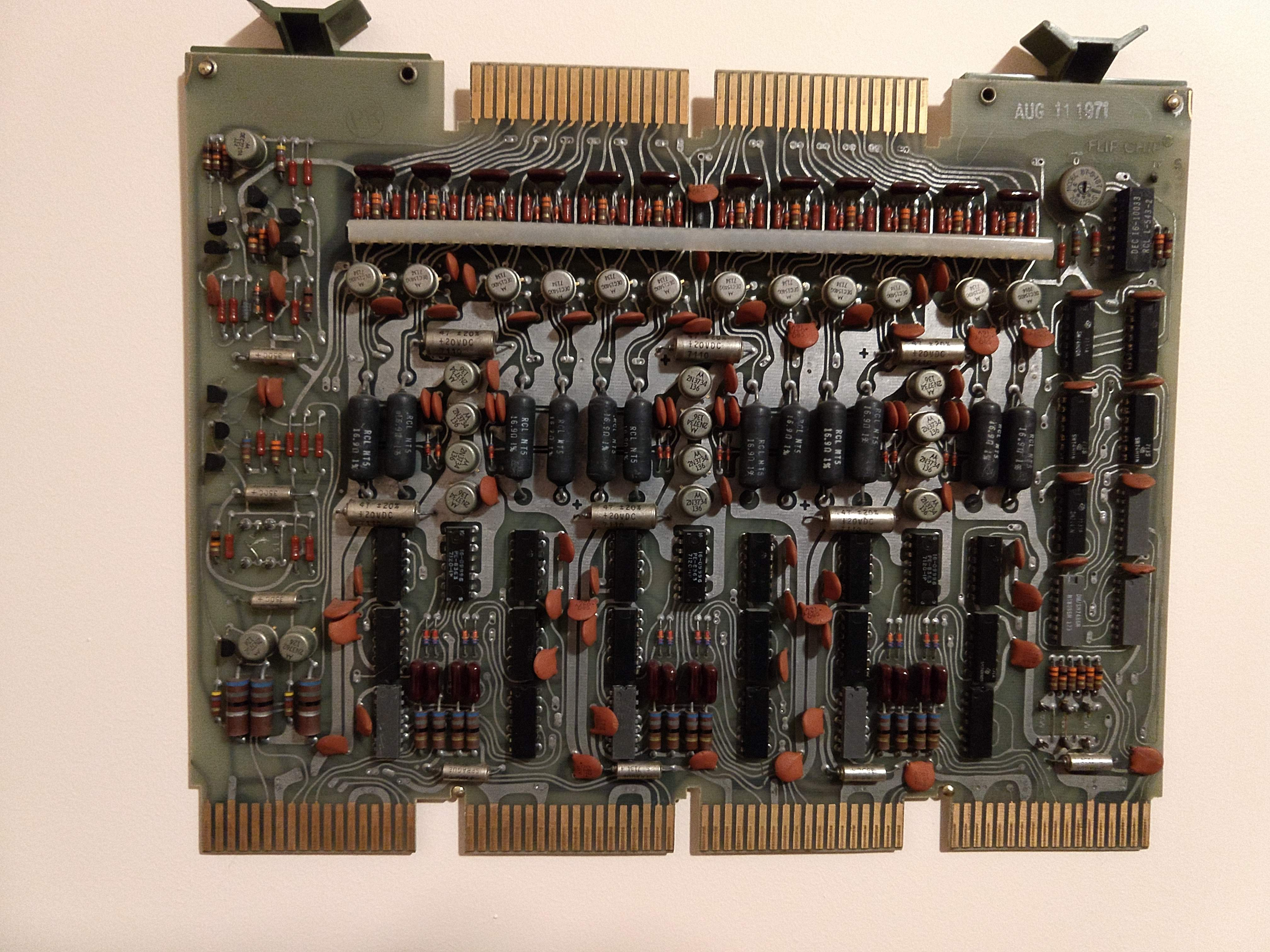
One of three inter-connected modules that make up a PDP-8 core memory plane.

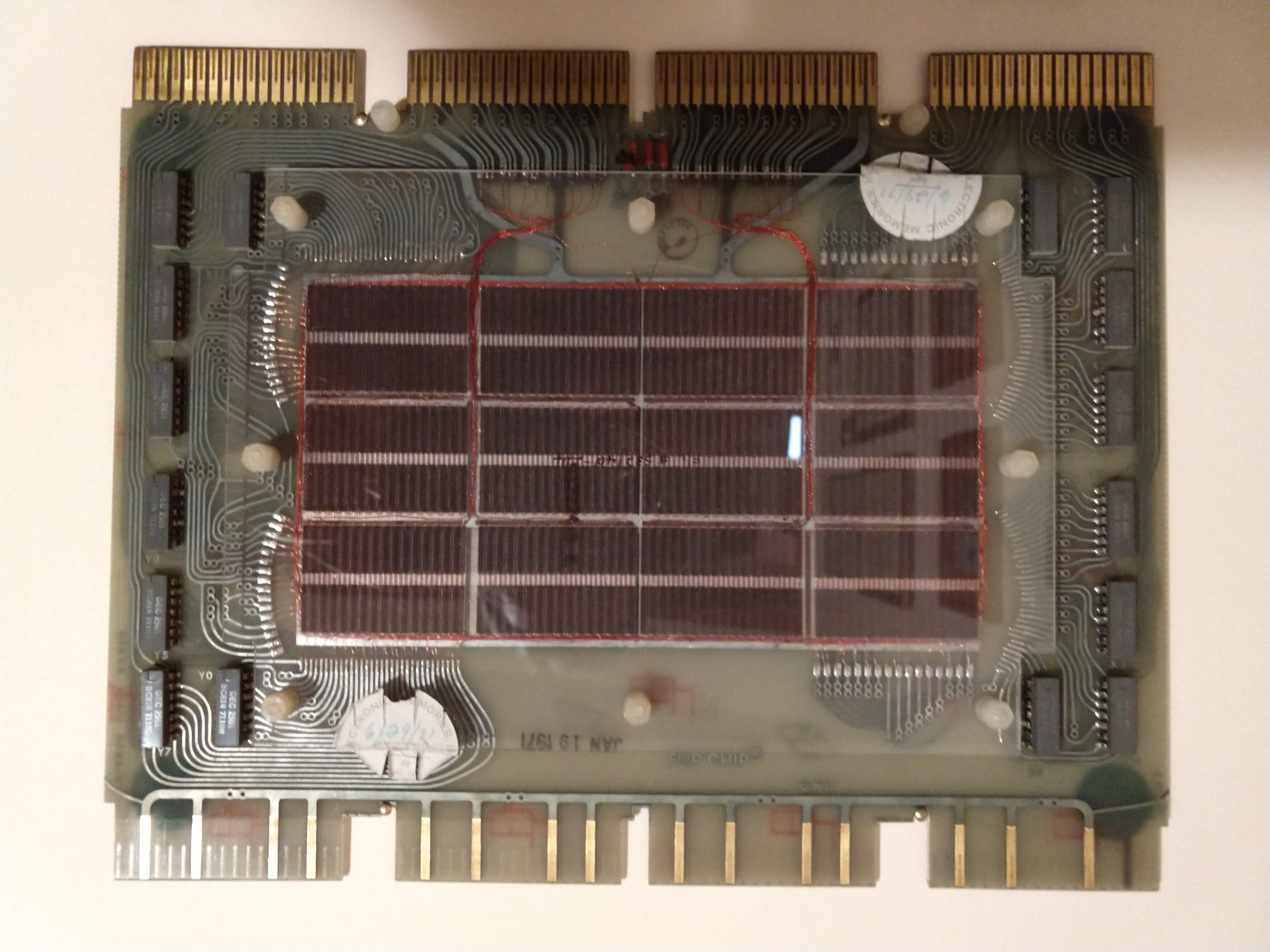
One of three inter-connected modules that make up a PDP-8 core memory plane. This is the middle of the three and contains the array of actual ferrite cores.

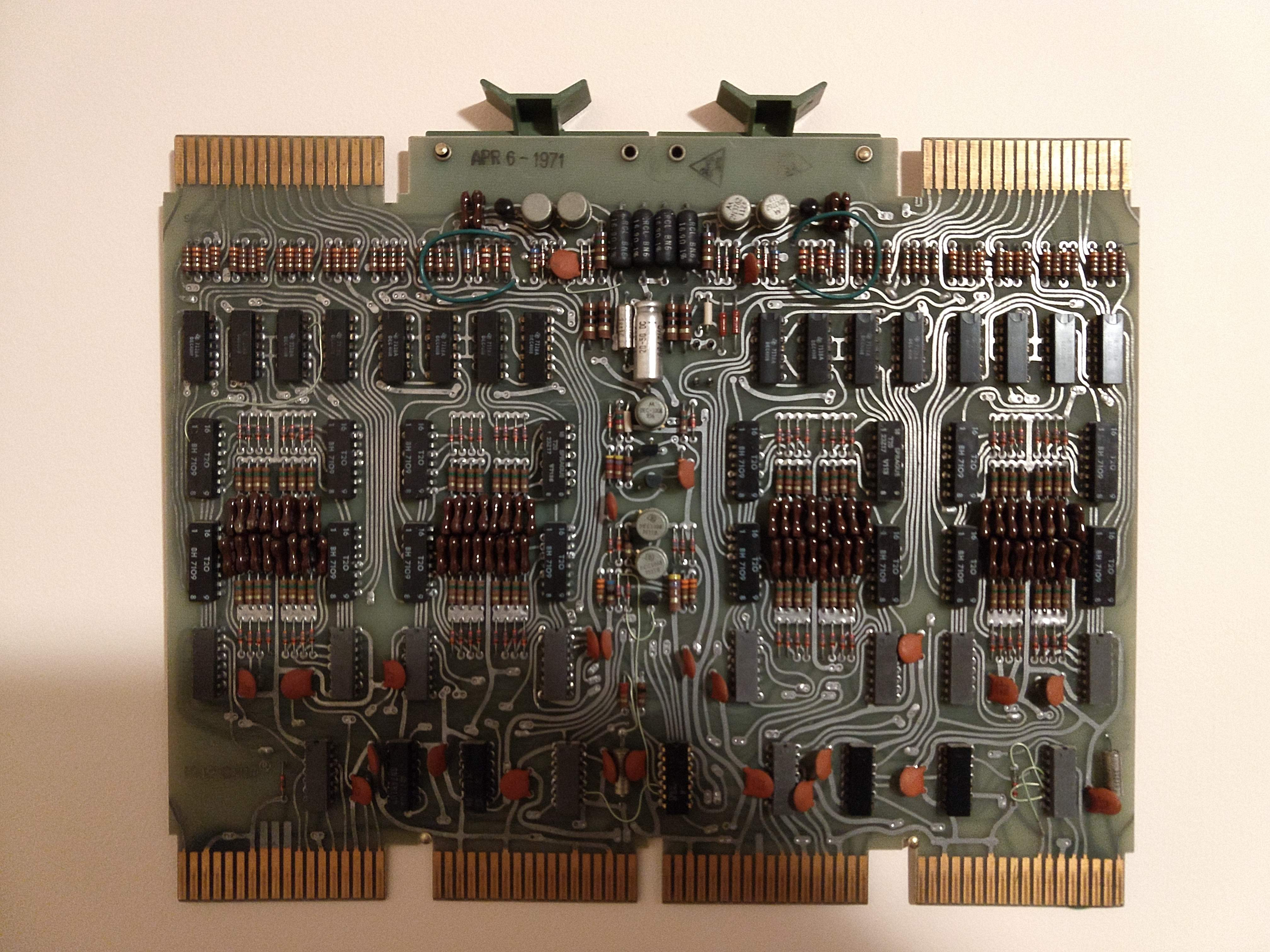
One of three inter-connected modules that make up a PDP-8 core memory plane.

A 12-bit word can have 4,096 different values, and this is the maximum number of words the original PDP-8 can address indirectly through a word pointer. 4,096 12-bit words represent 6,144 bytes in modern terminology, or 6 kB. As programs became more complex and the price of memory fell, it became desirable to expand this limit.

To maintain compatibility with pre-existing programs, new hardware outside the original design added high-order bits to the effective addresses generated by the program. The Memory Extension Controller expands the addressable memory by a factor of 8, to a total of 32,768 words. This expansion was thought sufficient because, with core memory then costing about 50 cents a word, a full 32K of memory would equal the cost of the CPU.

Each 4K of memory is called a field. The Memory Extension Controller contains two three-bit registers: the DF (Data Field) and the IF (Instruction Field). These registers specify a field for each memory reference of the CPU, making a total of 15 bits of address. The IF register specifies the field for instruction fetches and direct memory references; the DF register specifies the field for indirect data accesses. A program running in one field can reference data in the same field by direct addressing, and reference data in another field by indirect addressing.

A set of I/O instructions in the range 6200 through 6277 is handled by the Memory Extension Controller and give access to the DF and IF registers. The 62X1 instruction (CDF, Change Data Field) set the data field to X. Similarly 62X2 (CIF) set the instruction field, and 62X3 set both. Pre-existing programs would never execute CIF or CDF; the DF and IF registers would both point to the same field, a single field to which these programs were limited. The effect of the CIF instruction was deferred to coincide with the next JMP or JMS instruction, so that executing CIF would not cause a jump.

It was more complicated for multiple-field programs to deal with field boundaries and the DF and IF registers than it would have been if they could simply generate 15-bit addresses, but the design provided backward compatibility and is consistent with the 12-bit architecture used throughout the PDP-8. Compare the later Intel 8086, whose 16-bit memory addresses are expanded to 20 bits by combining them with the contents of a specified or implied segment register.

The extended memory scheme let existing programs handle increased memory with minimal changes. For example, 4K FOCAL normally had about 3K of code with only 1K left over for user program and data. With a few patches, FOCAL could use a second 4K field for user program and data. Moreover, additional 4K fields could be allocated to separate users, turning 4K FOCAL into a multi-user timesharing system.

Virtualization

On the PDP-8/E and later models, the Memory Extension Controller was enhanced to enable machine virtualization. A program written to use a PDP-8's entire resources can coexist with other such programs on the same PDP-8 under the control of a virtual machine manager. The manager can make all I/O instructions (including those that operated on the Memory Extension Controller) cause a trap (an interrupt handled by the manager). In this way, the manager can map memory references, map data or instruction fields, and redirect I/O to different devices. Each original program has complete access to a "virtual machine" provided by the manager.

New I/O instructions to the Memory Extension Controller retrieve the current value of the data and instruction fields, letting software save and restore most of the machine state across a trap. However, a program can not sense whether the CPU is in the process of deferring the effect of a CIF instruction (whether it has executed a CIF and not yet executed the matching jump instruction). The manager has to include a complete PDP-8 emulator (not difficult for an 8-instruction machine). Whenever a CIF instruction traps to the manager, it has to emulate the instructions up to the next jump. Fortunately, as a jump usually is the next instruction after CIF, this emulation does not slow programs down much, but it is a large workaround to a seemingly small design deficiency.

By the time of the PDP-8/A, memory prices had fallen enough that memory exceeding 32K was desirable. The 8/A added a new set of instructions for handling more than eight fields of memory. The field number could now be placed in the AC, rather than hard-coded into the instruction. However, by this time, the PDP-8 was in decline, so very little standard software was modified to use these new features.

== Examples ==
The following examples show code in PDP-8 assembly language as one might write for the PAL-III assembler.

=== Comparing two numbers ===
The following piece of code shows what is needed just to compare two numbers:

    / Compare numbers in memory at OPD1 and OPD2
            CLA CLL       / Must start with 0 in AC and link
            TAD OPD1      / Load first operand into AC (by adding it to 0); link is still clear
            CIA           / Complement, then increment AC, negating it
            TAD OPD2      / AC now has OPD2-OPD1; if OPD2≥OPD1, sum overflows and link is set
            SZL           / Skip if link is clear
            JMP OP2GT     / Jump somewhere in the case that OPD2≥OPD1;
                          / Otherwise, fall through to code below.

As shown, much of the text of a typical PDP-8 program focuses not on the author's intended algorithm but on low-level mechanics. This example illustrates an additional readability problem: To achieve a conditional JMP, one must code a skip instruction (to bypass the JMP) that highlights the opposite logical sense of the desired test.

=== Logical OR ===
The PDP-8 lacked many common low-level operations, including the logical OR instruction. A typical solution was to use De Morgan's laws and store the intermediate steps in memory. This code performs OR on operands in OPD1 and OPD2, uses memory location TMP for storage, and leaves the result of OPD1 OR OPD2 in AC:

            CLA         / clear AC
            TAD OPD1    / load the first operand into AC (by adding it to 0)
            CMA         / complement AC
            DCA TMP     / save that to memory location TMP and clear AC
            TAD OPD2    / load the second value into AC (by adding it to 0)
            CMA         / complement the result
            AND TMP     / AC = not(M) AND not(TMP)
            CMA         / complement result

=== String output ===
This complete PDP-8 assembly language program outputs "Hello, world!" to the teleprinter.

    *10                   / Set current assembly origin to address 10,
    STPTR,    STRNG-1     / An auto-increment register (one of eight at 10-17)

    *200                  / Set current assembly origin to program text area
    HELLO,  CLA CLL       / Clear AC and Link again (needed when we loop back from tls)
            TAD I Z STPTR / Get next character, indirect via PRE-auto-increment address from the zero page
            SNA           / Skip if non-zero (not end of string)
            HLT           / Else halt on zero (end of string)
            TSF           / Skip if teleprinter ready for character
            JMP .-1       / Else jump back and try again
            TLS           / Output the character in the AC to the teleprinter

            JMP HELLO     / Jump back for the next character

    STRNG,  310           / H
            345           / e
            354           / l
            354           / l
            357           / o
            254           /,
            240           / (space)
            367           / w
            357           / o
            362           / r
            354           / l
            344           / d
            241           / !
            0             / End of string
    $HELLO                /DEFAULT TERMINATOR

=== Subroutines ===
The PDP-8 processor does not implement a stack to store registers or other context when a subroutine is called or an interrupt occurs. (A stack can be implemented in software, as demonstrated in the next section.) Instead, the JMS instruction simply stores the updated PC (pointing past JMS, to the return address) at the effective address and jumps to the effective address plus one. The subroutine returned to its caller using an indirect JMP instruction that addresses the subroutine's first word.

For example, here is "Hello, World!" re-written to use a subroutine. When the JMS instruction jumps to the subroutine, it modifies the 0 coded at location OUT1:

    *10                     / Set current assembly origin to address 10,
    STPTR,  STRNG-1         / An auto-increment register (one of eight at 10-17)

    *200                    / Set assembly origin (load address)
    LOOP,   TAD I STPTR     / Pre-increment mem location 10, fetch indirect to get the next character of our message
            SNA             / Skip on non-zero AC
            HLT             / Else halt at end of message
            JMS OUT1        / Write out one character
            JMP LOOP        / And loop back for more
    OUT1,   0               / Will be replaced by caller's updated PC
            TSF             / Skip if printer ready
            JMP .-1         / Wait for flag
            TLS             / Send the character in the AC
            CLA CLL         / Clear AC and Link for next pass
            JMP I OUT1      / Return to caller
    STRNG, "H               / A well-known message
           "e               /
           "l               / NOTE:
           "l               /
           "o               /   Strings in PAL-8 and PAL-III were "sixbit"
           ",               /   To use ASCII, we spell it out, character by character
           "                /
           "w               /
           "o               /
           "r               /
           "l               /
           "d               /
           "!               /
           015              /
           012              /
           0                / Mark the end of our null-terminated string (.ASCIZ hadn't been invented yet!)

The fact that the JMS instruction uses the word just before the code of the subroutine to deposit the return address prevents reentrancy and recursion without additional work by the programmer. It also makes it difficult to use ROM with the PDP-8 because read-write return-address storage is commingled with read-only code storage in the address space. Programs intended to be placed into ROMs approach this problem in several ways:

- They copy themselves to read-write memory before execution, or
- They are placed into special ROM cards that provide a few words of read/write memory, accessed indirectly through the use of a thirteenth flag bit in each ROM word.
- They avoid the use of subroutines; or use code such as the following, instead of the JMS instruction, to put the return address in read-write memory:

    JUMPL, DCA TEMP         / Deposit the accumulator in some temporary location
           TAD JUMPL+3      / Load the return address into the accumulator: hard coded
           JMP SUBRO        / Go to the subroutine, and have it handle jumping back (to JUMPL+3)

The use of the JMS instruction makes debugging difficult. If a programmer makes the mistake of having a subroutine call itself, directly or by an intermediate subroutine, then the return address for the outer call is destroyed by the return address of the subsequent call, leading to an infinite loop. If one module is coded with an incorrect or obsolete address for a subroutine, it would not just fail to execute the entire code sequence of the subroutine, it might modify a word of the subroutine's code, depositing a return address that the processor might interpret as an instruction during a subsequent correct call to the subroutine. Both types of error might become evident during the execution of code that was written correctly.

=== Software stack ===
Though the PDP-8 does not have a hardware stack, stacks can be implemented in software. Here are example PUSH and POP subroutines, simplified to omit issues such as testing for stack overflow and underflow:

    *100              /make routines accessible for next example
    PUSH, 0
          DCA DATA
          CLA CMA     / -1
          TAD SP
          DCA SP
          TAD DATA
          DCA I SP
          JMP I PUSH     /Return

    POP,  0
          CLA CLL
          TAD I SP
          ISZ SP
          JMP I POP

    DATA, 0
    SP, 0

And here is "Hello World" with this "stack" implemented, and "OUT" subroutine:

    *200
    MAIN,  CLA CLL         /Set the message pointer
           TAD (MESSG      /To the beginning of the message (literal)
           DCA SP

    LOOP,  JMS POP
           SNA             /Stop execution if zero
           HLT
           JMS OUT         /Otherwise, output a character
           JMP LOOP

    MESSG, "H
           "e
           "l
           "l
           "o
           ",
           "
           "w
           "o
           "r
           "l
           "d
           "!
           015
           012
           0

    OUT,    0               / Will be replaced by caller's updated PC
            TSF             / Skip if printer ready
            JMP .-1         / Wait for flag
            TLS             / Send the character in the AC
            CLA CLL         / Clear AC and Link for next pass
            JMP I OUT       / Return to caller

=== Linked list ===
Another possible subroutine for the PDP-8 is a linked list.

     GETN, 0     /Gets the number pointed to and moves the pointer
     CLA CLL     /Clear accumulator
     TAD I PTR   /Gets the number pointed to
     DCA TEMP    /Save current value
     ISZ PTR     /Increment pointer
     TAD I PTR   /Get next address
     DCA PTR     /Put in pointer
     JMP I GETN  /return
     PTR,  0
     TEMP, 0

== Interrupts ==
There is a single interrupt line on the PDP-8 I/O bus. The processor handles any interrupt by disabling further interrupts and executing a JMS to location 0000. As it is difficult to write reentrant subroutines, it is difficult to nest interrupts and this is usually not done; each interrupt runs to completion and re-enables interrupts just before executing the JMP I 0 instruction that returns from the interrupt.

Because there is only a single interrupt line on the I/O bus, the occurrence of an interrupt does not inform the processor of the source of the interrupt. Instead, the interrupt service routine has to serially poll each active I/O device to see if it is the source. The code that does this is called a skip chain because it consists of a series of PDP-8 "test and skip if flag set" I/O instructions. (It was not unheard-of for a skip chain to reach its end without finding any device in need of service.) The relative interrupt priority of the I/O devices is determined by their position in the skip chain: If several devices interrupt, the device tested earlier in the skip chain is serviced first.

== Books ==
An engineering textbook popular in the 1980s, The Art of Digital Design by David Winkel and Franklin Prosser, contains an example problem spanning several chapters in which the authors demonstrate the process of designing a computer that is compatible with the PDP-8/I. The function of every component is explained. Although it is not a production design, as it uses more modern SSI and MSI components and solid state rather than core memory, the exercise provides a detailed description of the computer's operation.

== Unlicensed clones ==
The USSR produced the minicomputers Saratov-1 and Saratov-2, which cloned the PDP-8 and PDP-8/E, respectively.

There was a minicomputer named IZOT-0310, produced in Bulgaria in 70s and 80s, which cloned PDP-8L.

In Cuba, the Instituto Central de Investigación Digital (ICID), now COMBIOMED, produced in the 70s the minicomputers CID-201, CID 201-A and CID 201-B, partial clones (architecture and instructions) of PDP-8/S and PDP-8/L.
