= Ledex =

Ledex produces a line of motorized solenoids and electric switches used in a wide variety of industrial applications. The original product used a ratcheting system to provide one-way motion so that every activation advanced the switch one position. The company used the same concept to develop a number of similar products and later branched out to the wider industrial switching market. Over time the term has become generic and can now refer to any similar motorized switch. Ledex was founded by G.H. Leland. Its predecessor was GH Leland Engineering in Dayton Ohio. Patents were filed on its behalf in 1950.

The company is currently owned by Hong Kong company, Johnson Electric, and Ledex Solenoids are sold under Johnson Electric Industrial. Johnson Electric in North America is located north of Dayton Ohio.

== Notable history ==
George H. Leland worked as a designer at General Electric before founding Leland Electric Company. He invented and patented a rotary solenoid during World War II, and after that first company declined to pursue the product, he founded his second company - Leland Development and Engineering Company - later called Ledex, Inc.

Six of their Syncramental Servo-Step motors rode along on John Glenn's Mercury capsule Friendship 7 in America's first crewed orbital spacecraft, February 20, 1962. Mariner IV used a Ledex rotary solenoid to actuate the onboard camera to take the first pictures of Mars from Martian orbit. Surveyor used Ledex stepping motors to orient the data antenna after landing on the Moon. Apollo spacecraft used Ledex rotary solenoids to release the spring loaded latches located between the Command Module and the Lunar Landing Module to complete hard docking of the two modules.
