= Intersil =

American company

Intersil Americas Inc.
- Type: Subsidiary
- Founded: 1967, 1999
- Headquarters: Milpitas, California, United States
- Key people: Necip Sayiner, EVP, President and CEO
- Products: Semiconductors
- Revenue: ▼US$562.6 million (2014)
- Net income: ▲US$54.8 million (2014)
- Number of employees: 1031
- Parent: Renesas Electronics
- Website: www.intersil.com

Logo used while operating under General Electric

Intersil is an American semiconductor company headquartered in Milpitas, California. It was formed in 1967 by Jean Hoerni, one of the original traitorous eight. The company initially worked primarily on analog electronics, but later moved into CMOS designs and produced some of the earliest electronic watches. They produced a series of CMOS devices, including the Intersil 6100, a single-chip implementation of the PDP-8 computer.

Intersil was purchased by Harris Corporation in 1988, one of Intersil's major second source providers. The Intersil brand was later abandoned and became Harris Semiconductor. In August 1999, Harris sold off its semiconductor division to a newly-formed Intersil Corp. This was purchased by Renesas in February 2017. Today, it concentrates on power management IC, with specialized capability in power management and precision analog technology for applications in industrial, infrastructure, mobile, automotive and aerospace.

== Company history ==
The original Intersil, Inc. was founded in 1967 by the Swiss physicist Jean Hoerni to develop analog circuits based on bipolar and field effect transistors, including operational amplifiers. This led to work on many small integrated circuit designs, including an analog comparator for NASA, and later a shutter-speed calculator for Canon Inc. This led to considerable work with and for Analog Devices (AD), and eventually AD put one engineer in Intersil's offices as a liaison.

Hoerni arranged a deal with Omega SA to develop a custom digital watch ICs. To meet the power requirements of a battery-powered device, the company had to use CMOS technology, and were a pioneer in this field. This was carried out by a new division, Eurosil, partially funded by SSIH, a Swiss watchmaking industry group. Later, Intersil had a development contract with the Japanese company Daini Seikosha and became supplier of watch ICs for Seiko.

When microprocessors emerged in the 1970s, Intersil participated with its 12-bit IM6100, which was the first microprocessor produced in CMOS technology. It emulated the PDP-8 instruction set. Intersil was also the manufacturer of the RCA (CDP)1802 microprocessor (also known as RCA COSMAC), a CPU traditionally used in space applications.

In 1988, Intersil was taken over by Harris Semiconductor, which had offered the IM6100 as second source. Harris combined these activities with the semiconductor divisions of Radiation Incorporated, General Electric and RCA it had taken over before. In 1999 Harris spun off its entire semiconductor division and Intersil Corporation was created with the largest IPO in American semiconductor industry history. The second Intersil Corporation is a different company from the original Intersil, Inc.

Next to digital circuits like microprocessors and memories like the 1k-bit CMOS RAM IM6508 and CMOS EPROMS IM6604/IM6654 Intersil designed famous analogue ICs like the ICL8038 waveform generator. A creation of Intersil (as Harris Semiconductor) is the PRISM line of Wi-Fi hardware: that group of products was sold to GlobespanVirata in 2003, and maintained by Conexant.

In the 2000s, Intersil established market leadership in Vcore power management for PCs, switching and buck boost regulators for industrial and consumer power systems, and radiation hardened analog and power ICs for military and commercial applications.

The company, under CEO Dave Bell, then began the expansion of a catalog analog business. The company also completed a series of acquisitions, two of which are still part of the portfolio, Zilker Labs digital power devices and Techwell automotive and security and surveillance products. In May 2002, Intersil Corp. acquired Elantec Semiconductor. In March 2004, Intersil Corp. acquired analog chipmaker Xicor Inc. for about $529 million.

In 2012, with revenue in decline, the company's board of directors removed Dave Bell and began a search for a new CEO. In March 2013, the board appointed Necip Sayiner, the architect of Silicon Labs' turnaround, as CEO. Sayiner concentrated the company's efforts on power management and select target markets. The company was able to return to profitability in 2013 and in early 2014 re-launched as a power management company, with products to improve power efficiency, extend battery life and reduce size.

Japanese semiconductor company Renesas acquired Intersil on February 24, 2017.

== Products ==
Intersil develops and markets power management and analog technology for applications in the industrial, infrastructure, mobile, automotive and aerospace markets.

The company supplies power integrated circuits including battery management, computing power, display power, regulators and controllers and power modules; as well as analog components such as amplifiers and buffers, proximity and light sensors, data converters, timing products, optoelectronics and interface products.

== See also ==
- Intersil 6100
- RTX2010
