= PDP-8/e =

1970 model of the DEC PDP-8 line of minicomputers

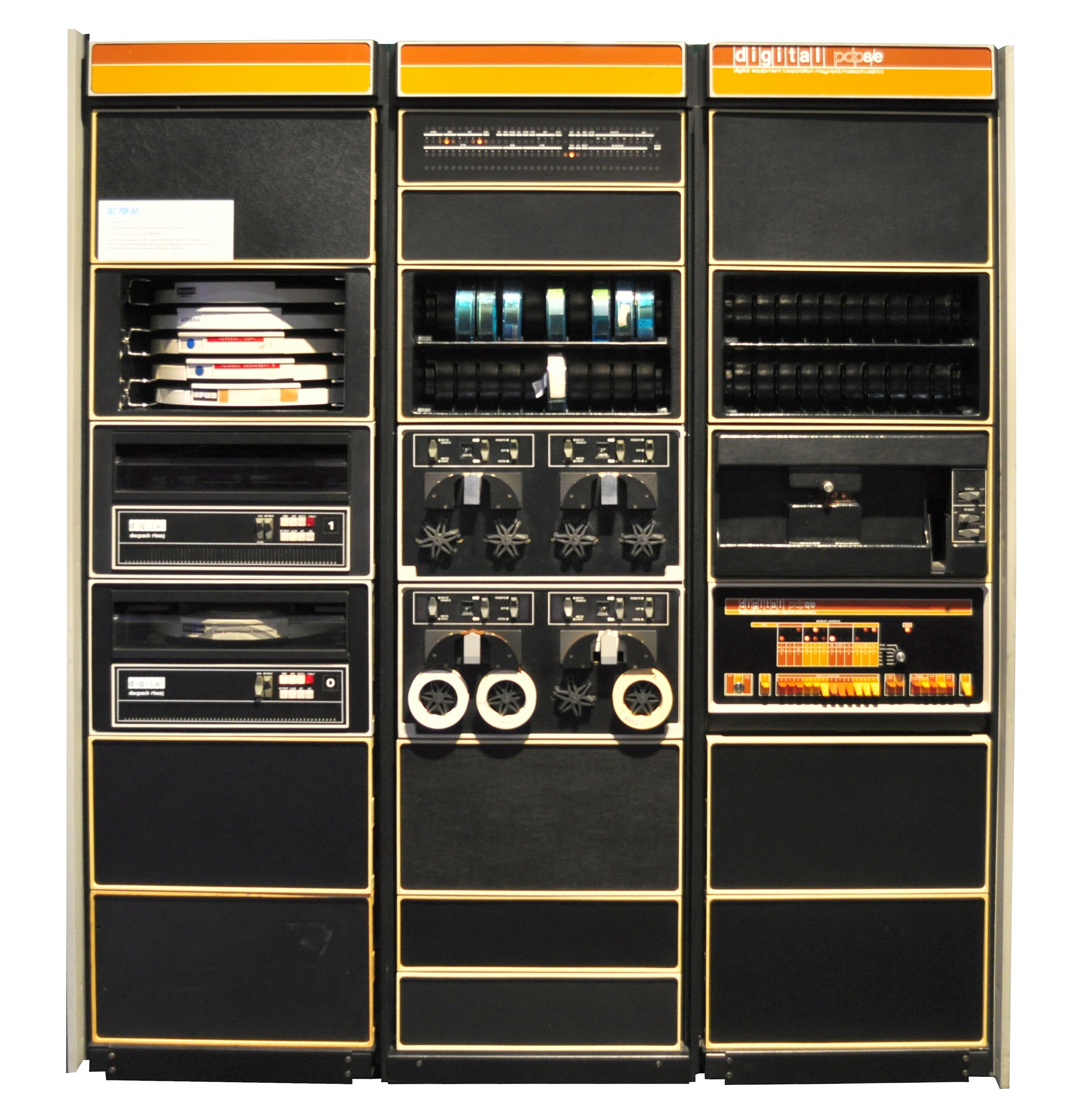
- PDP-8/e at the Living Computer Museum in Seattle, Washington
- Manufacturer: Digital Equipment Corporation
- Product family: PDP-8
- Generation: Third generation
- Released: 1970
- Introductory price: $6,500
- Operating system: OS/8

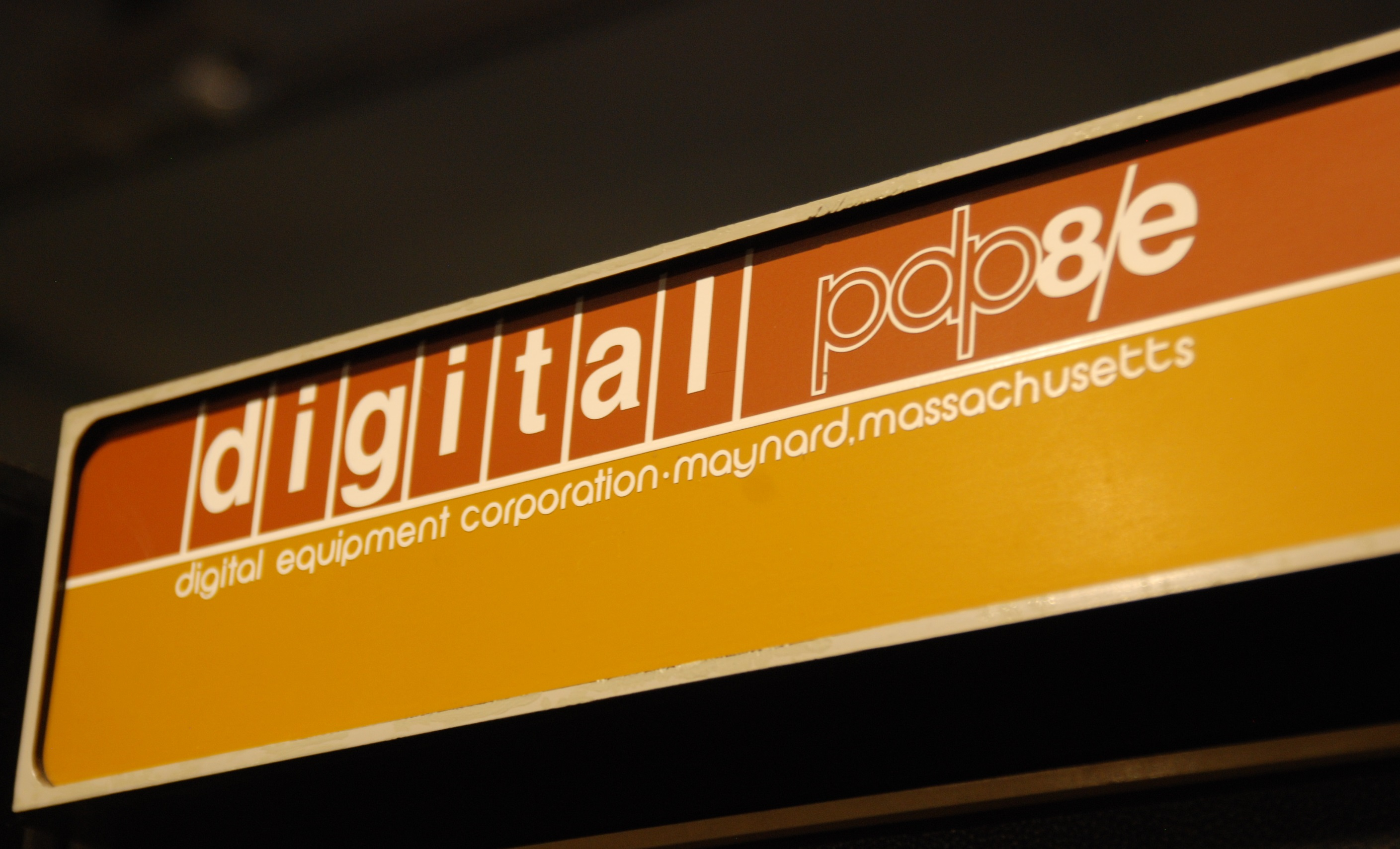
Label panel with PDP-8/e name

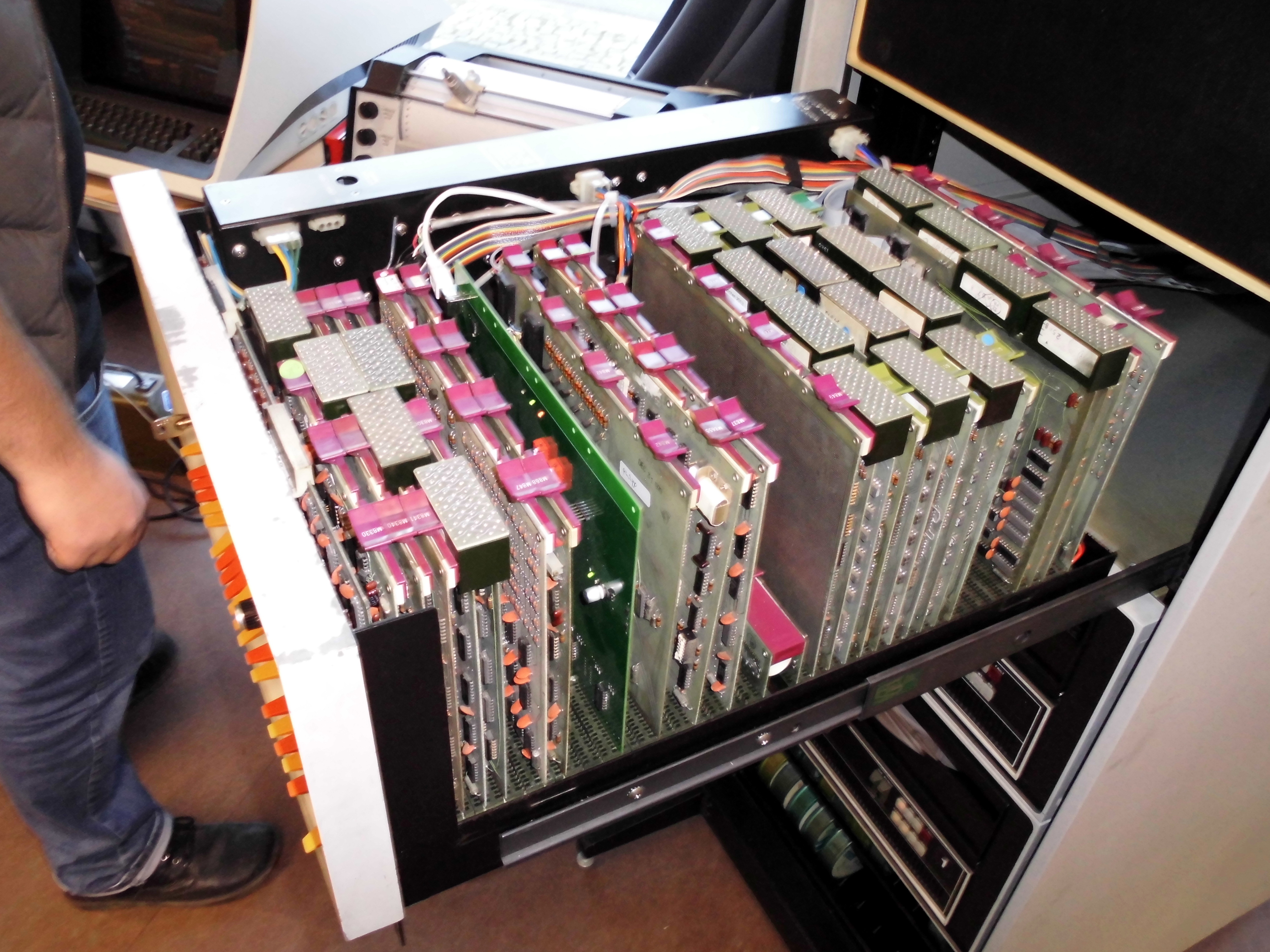
CPU was built using DEC M-series Flip Chip modules

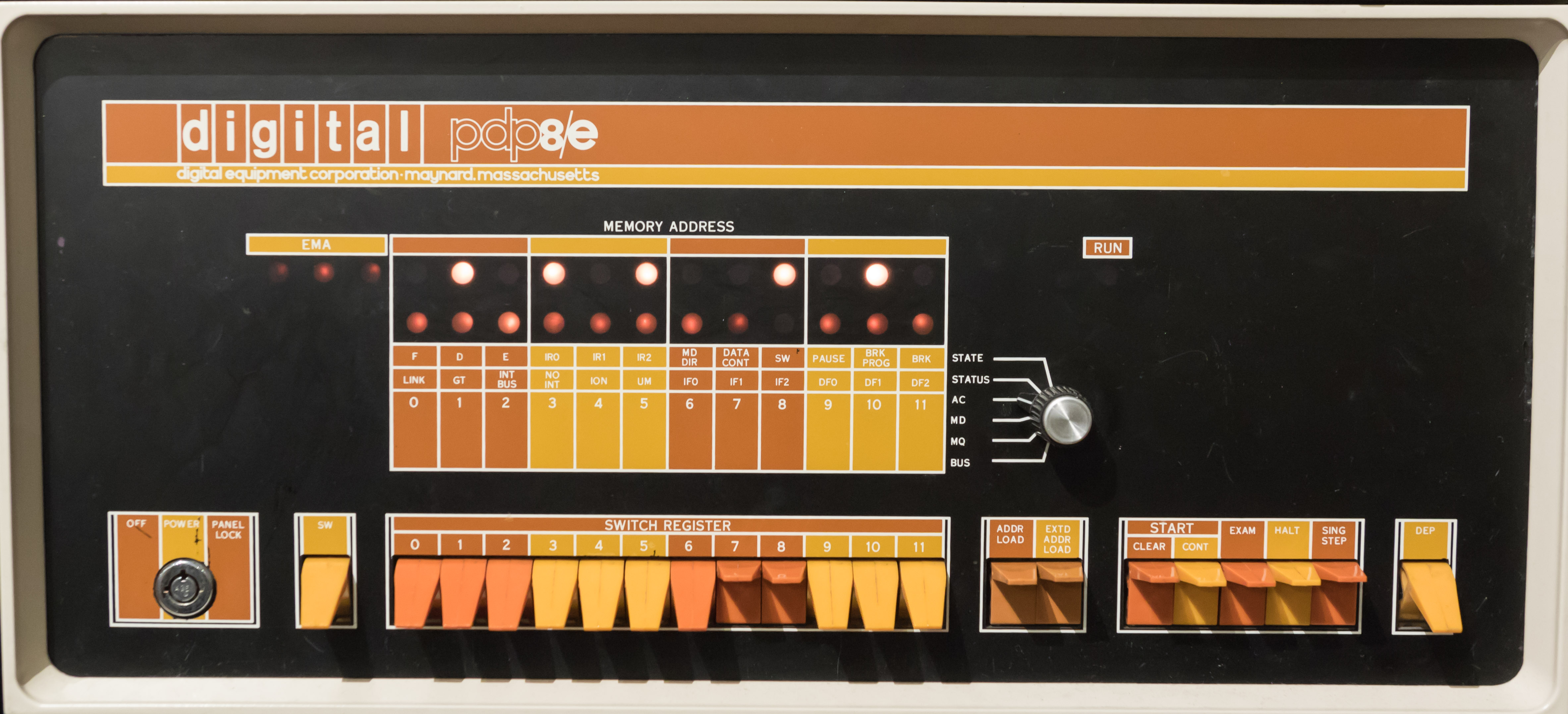
Front panel switches were grouped for octal notation

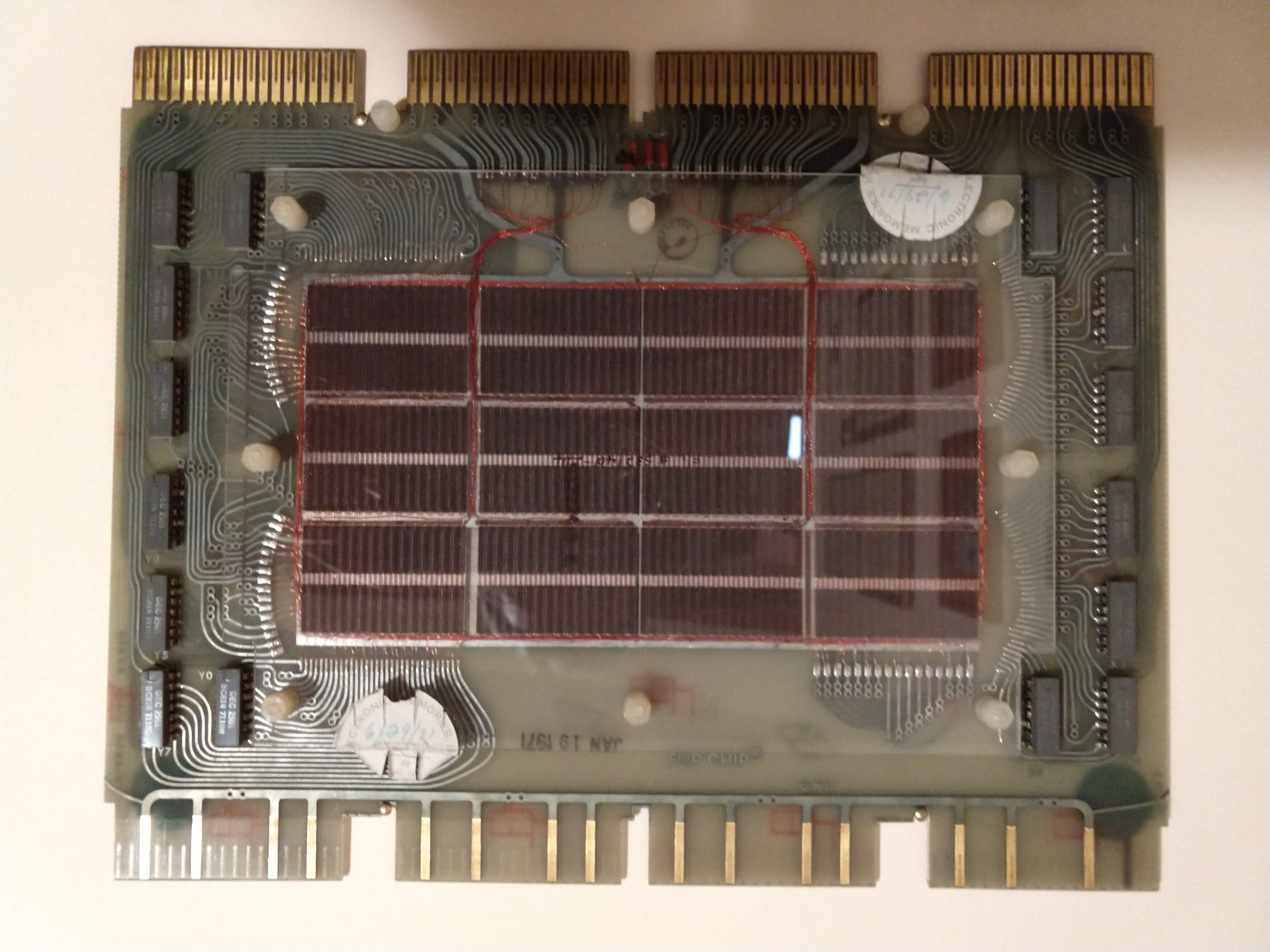
Core memory plane for PDP-8

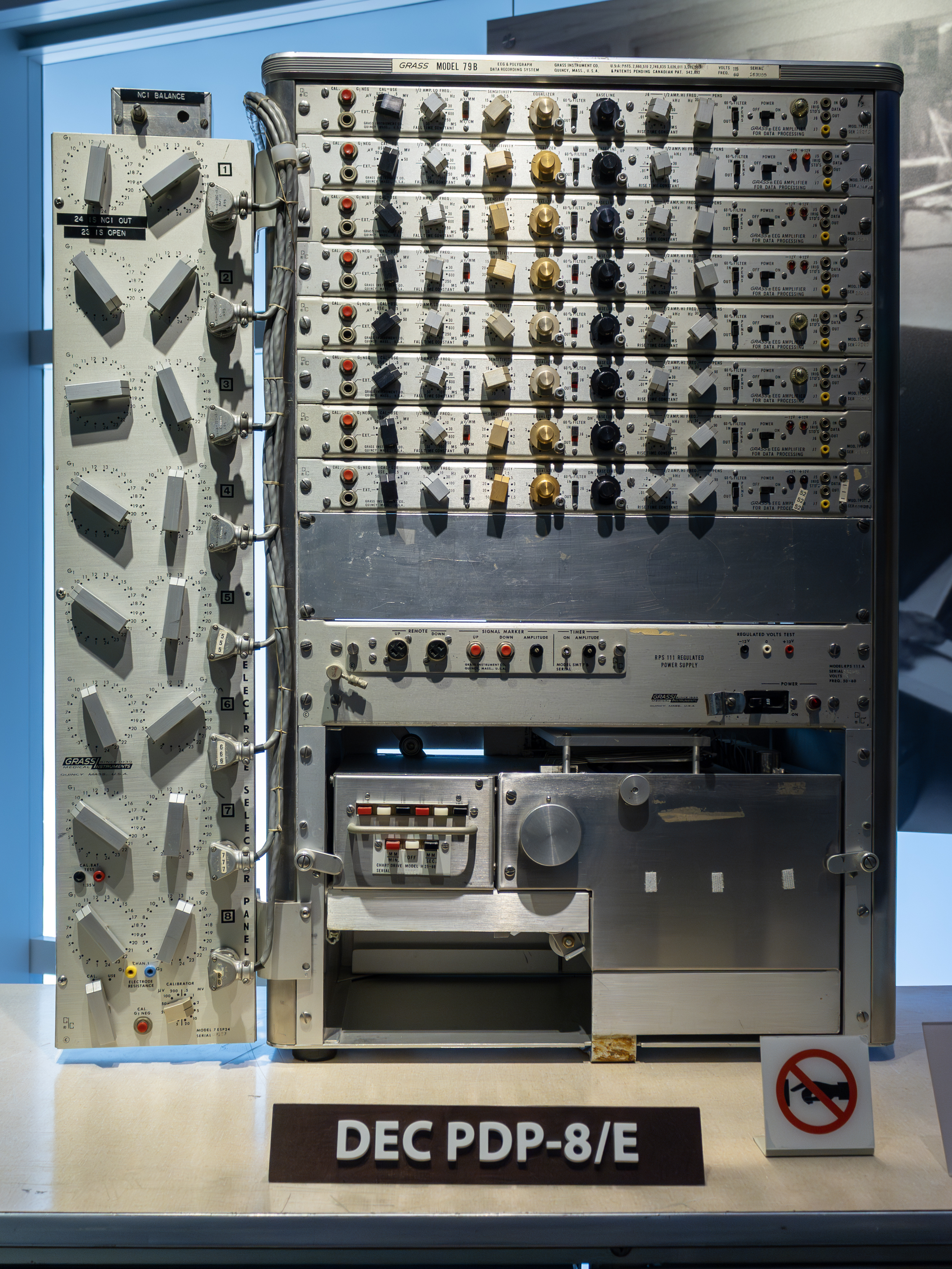
A PDP-8/E station used for monitoring patients during brain surgery

The PDP-8/e was a model of the PDP-8 line of minicomputers, designed by the Digital Equipment Corporation to be a general-purpose computer that inexpensively met the needs of the average user while also being capable of modular expansion to meet the more specific needs of advanced users.

== Description ==
The first prototype was built in 1970, and was among the first minicomputers small enough to fit in the back seat of a Volkswagen Beetle Convertible. It originally sold for $6,500 (roughly equivalent to $53,000 today) but after 18 months the price was dropped to $4995 (roughly $39,000 today) to make it the only computer under $5000 available at that time.

The standard -8/e included a processor, magnetic core memory, a data terminal, a tape control and drive, a programmers table, a line printer, and the software operating system, and when purchased also included installation, training, and maintenance as part of the purchase agreement.

The PDP-8/e featured a processor with single-address fixed word length, parallel transfer computer using 12-bit, two's complement arithmetic. The 1.2/1.4 microsecond cycle time provides a computation rate of 385,000 additions per second. It was built to be versatile and has a high-capacity input/output that supports more than 60 types of peripherals. It could be used for a variety of tasks, from keeping score at Fenway Park to monitoring stimuli to the brain during brain surgery at Massachusetts General Hospital.

== Basic system ==
The basic PDP-8/E system was a 10.5 × 19 × 24-inch (6 rack unit or "6U") rackmount or table top unit that contained the processor, core memory, front panel controls ("programmer's console"), console terminal interface for use with an external data terminal, and 115- or 230-volt AC power supply.

== Peripherals ==
=== Processor options ===
- Extended Arithmetic Element - enables the performance of complex arithmetic at high speeds
- FPP-12 Floating Point Processor - provides a dual-processor capability for faster calculations
- Power Fail and Automatic Restart - restores operation automatically after a power failure and protects the operating program
- Real-time clocks - programmable, line frequency, or crystal controlled intervals
- MI8-E hardware bootstrap, an array of diodes allowing startup without manually toggling in the bootstrap via the front panel

=== Mass storage devices ===
- DECtape magnetic tape drives
- RX01 8-inch floppy disk drives (256kB)
- RK05 hard drive with removable cartridge (2.5 Mb). Left rack in photo
- Paper tape readers and punches - Punches up to 50 characters a second, reads up to 300 characters per second
- Card readers - Marked or punched cards read at 300 cards per minute

=== Display devices ===
- Video and writing tablets - alphanumeric and graphic display point-plot displays; light pens; telephone line transmission
- Hard-copy devices - incremental plotters; line printers with 64- or 96-characters sets, 165 characters per second or 356 lines per minute

=== Data communications devices ===
- Synchronous communications - modem interface for Bell 201- and 300-series modems or equivalent
- Asynchronous communications - serial-line interface at various send/receive Baud rates; single or double buffered interfaces\
- Automatic calling units - 10-channel multiplexer

=== Laboratory devices ===
- Analog to Digital Converters
- Digital to Analog Converters
- Programmable Real-Time Clock
- Digital I/O
- Heathkit EU-801E Laboratory I/O buffered interface, provided a 12-bit wide data port to the PDP-8. Used by David Larsen (Virginia Tech) in his course to instruct researchers in interfacing minicomputers

=== Terminals ===
- CRT and data-entry terminals - alphanumeric 16-character keyboards; standard telephone line transmission
- Teletype terminals - send and receive only; synchronous read and punch
- Hard-copy terminals - serial or parallel interfaces
