= DECtape =

Magnetic tape data storage medium

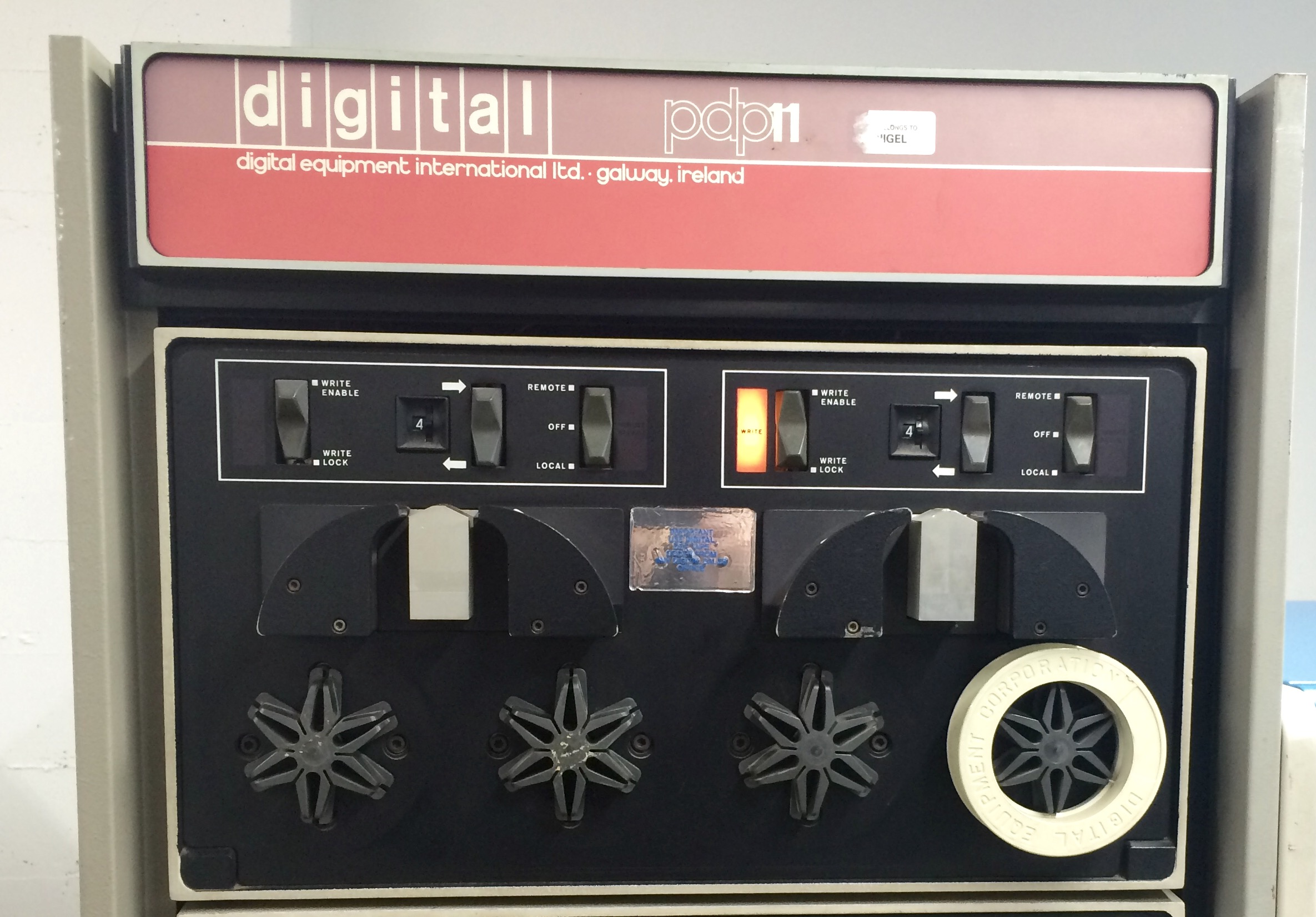
A TU56 dual DECtape unit for a DEC PDP-11. Note the 6-armed "starfish" hubs holding circular white tape reels in place. The vertical aluminium block above each pair of tape reels holds the read/write heads.

DECtape, originally called Microtape, is a magnetic tape data storage medium used with many Digital Equipment Corporation computers, including the PDP-1, PDP-4, PDP-6, PDP-8, LINC-8, PDP-9, PDP-10, PDP-11, PDP-12, and the PDP-15. On DEC's 32-bit systems, VAX/VMS support for it was implemented but did not become an official part of the product lineup.

DECtapes are 3/4 inch (19 mm) wide, and formatted into blocks of data that can each be read or written individually. Each tape stores 184K 12-bit PDP-8 words or 144K 18-bit words (equivalent to 276 kilobytes). Block size is 128 12-bit words (for the 12-bit machines), or 256 18-bit words for the other machines (16, 18, 32, or 36-bit systems).

From a programming point of view, because the system is block-oriented and allows random seeking, DECtape behaves like a very slow disk drive.

== Origins ==
DECtape has its origin in the LINCtape tape system, which was originally designed by Wesley Clark at the MIT Lincoln Laboratory as an integral part of the LINC computer. There are simple LINC instructions for reading and writing tape blocks using a single machine instruction. The design of the LINC, including LINCtape, was placed in the public domain because its development had been funded by the government. LINCtape drives were manufactured by several companies, including Digital.

In turn, LINCtape's origin can be found in the magnetic tape system for the historic Lincoln Laboratory TX-2 computer, designed by Richard L. Best and T. C. Stockebrand. The TX-2 Tape System is the direct ancestor of LINCtape, including the use of two redundant sets of five tracks and a direct drive tape transport, but it uses a physically incompatible tape format (½-inch tape on 10-inch reels, where LINC tape and DECtape used ¾-inch tape on 4-inch reels).

Digital initially introduced the Type 550 Microtape Control and Type 555 Dual Microtape Transport as peripherals for the PDP-1 and PDP-4 computers, both 18-bit machines. DEC advertised the availability of these peripherals in March and May, 1963, and by November, planning was already underway to offer the product for the 12-bit PDP-5 and 36-bit PDP-6, even though this involved a change in recording format. The initial specifications for the Type 550 controller discuss a significant advance beyond the LINCtape, the ability to read and write in either direction. By late 1964, the Type 555 transport was being marketed as a DECtape transport.

The tape transport used on the LINC is essentially the same as the Type 555 transport, with the same interface signals and the same physical tape medium. The LINC and DEC controllers, however, are incompatible, and the positions of the supply and take-up reels were reversed between the LINC and DEC tape formats. While LINCtape supports high-speed bidirectional block search, it only supports actual data read and write operations in the forward direction. DECtape uses a significantly different mark track format to provide for the possibility of read and write operations in either direction, although not all DECtape controllers support reverse read. DEC applied for a patent on the enhanced features incorporated into DECtape in late 1964. The inventor listed on this patent, Thomas Stockebrand, is also an author of the paper on the TX-2 tape system from which the LINC tape was derived.

Eventually, the TC12-F tape controller on the PDP-12 supported both LINCtape and DECtape on the same transport. As with the earlier LINC-8, the PDP-12 is a PDP-8 augmented with hardware support for the LINC instruction set and associated laboratory peripherals.

== Technical details ==
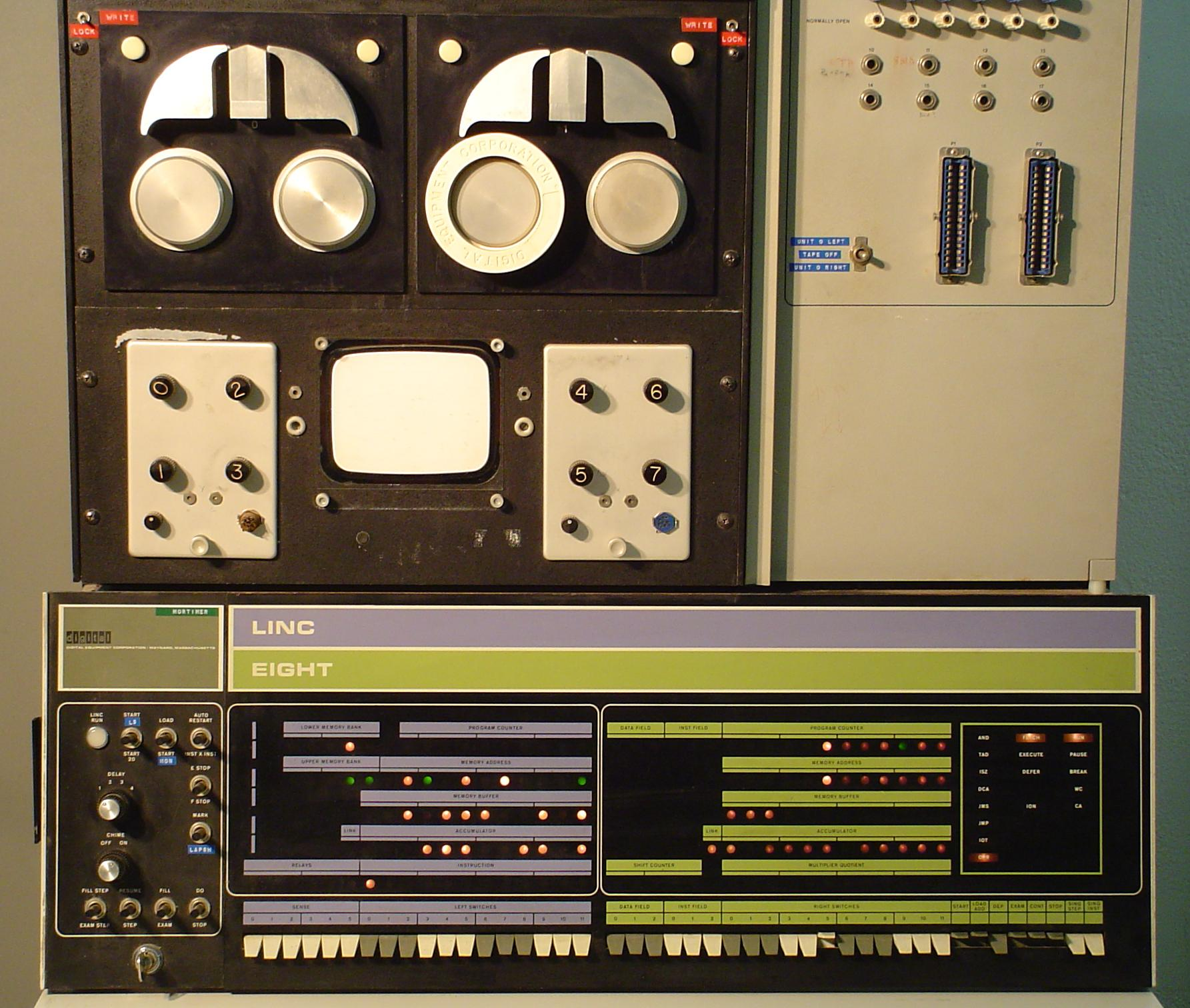
A partially restored LINC-8, including LINCtape drives

DECtape was designed to be reliable and durable enough to be used as the main storage medium for a computer's operating system (OS). It is possible, although slow, to use a DECtape drive to run a small OS such as OS/8 or OS/12. The system would be configured to put temporary swap files on a second DECtape drive, so as to not slow down access to the main drive holding the system programs.

Upon its introduction, DECtape was considered a major improvement over hand-loaded paper tapes, which could not be used to support swap files essential for practical timesharing. Early hard disk and drum drives were very expensive, limited in capacity, and notoriously unreliable, so the DECtape was a breakthrough in supporting the first timesharing systems on DEC computers. The legendary PDP-1 at MIT, where early computer hacker culture developed, adopted multiple DECtape drives to support a primitive software sharing community. The hard disk system (when it was working) was considered a "temporary" file storage device used for speed, not to be trusted to hold files for long-term storage. Computer users would keep their own personal work files on DECtapes, as well as software to be shared with others.

The design of DECtape and its controllers is quite different from any other type of tape drive or controller at the time. The tape is 0.75 in (19 mm) wide, accommodating 6 data tracks, 2 mark tracks, and 2 clock tracks, with data recorded at roughly 350 bits per inch (138 bits per cm). Each track is paired with a non-adjacent track for redundancy by wiring the tape heads in parallel; as a result the electronics only deal with 5 tracks: a clock track, a mark track and 3 data tracks. Manchester encoding (PE) was used. The clock and mark tracks are written only once, when the tape was formatted; after that, they are read-only. This meant a "drop-out" on one channel could be tolerated; even a hole punched through the tape with a 0.25 in (6.4 mm) hole punch will not cause the read to fail.

Another reason for DECtape's unusually high reliability is the use of laminated tape: the magnetic oxide is sandwiched between two layers of mylar, rather than being on the surface as was common in other magnetic tape types. This allows the tape to survive many thousands of passes over the tape heads without wearing away the oxide layer, which would otherwise have occurred in heavy swap file use on timesharing systems.

The fundamental durability and reliability of DECtape was underscored when the design of the tape reel mounting hubs was changed in the early 1970s. The original machined metal hub with a retaining spring was replaced by a lower cost single-piece plastic hub with 6 flexible arms in a "starfish" or "flower" shape. When a defective batch of these new design hubs was shipped on new DECtape drives, these hubs would loosen over time. As a result, DECtape reels would fall off the drives, usually when being spun at full speed, as in an end-to-end seek. The reel of tape would fall onto the floor and roll in a straight line or circle, often unspooling and tangling the tape as it went. In spite of this horrifying spectacle, desperate users would carefully untangle that tape and wind it laboriously back onto the tape reel, then re-install it onto the hub, with a paper shim to hold the reel more tightly. The data on the mangled DECtape could often be recovered completely and copied to another tape, provided that the original tape had only been creased multiple times, and not stretched or broken. DEC quickly issued an Engineering Change Order (ECO) to replace the defective hubs to resolve the problem.

Eventually, a heavily used or abused DECtape begins to become unreliable. The operating system is usually programmed to keep retrying a failed read operation, which often succeeds after multiple attempts. Experienced DECtape users learned to notice the characteristic "shoe-shining" motion of a failing DECtape as it is passed repeatedly back and forth over the tape heads, and would retire the tape from further use.

== On non-DEC computers ==
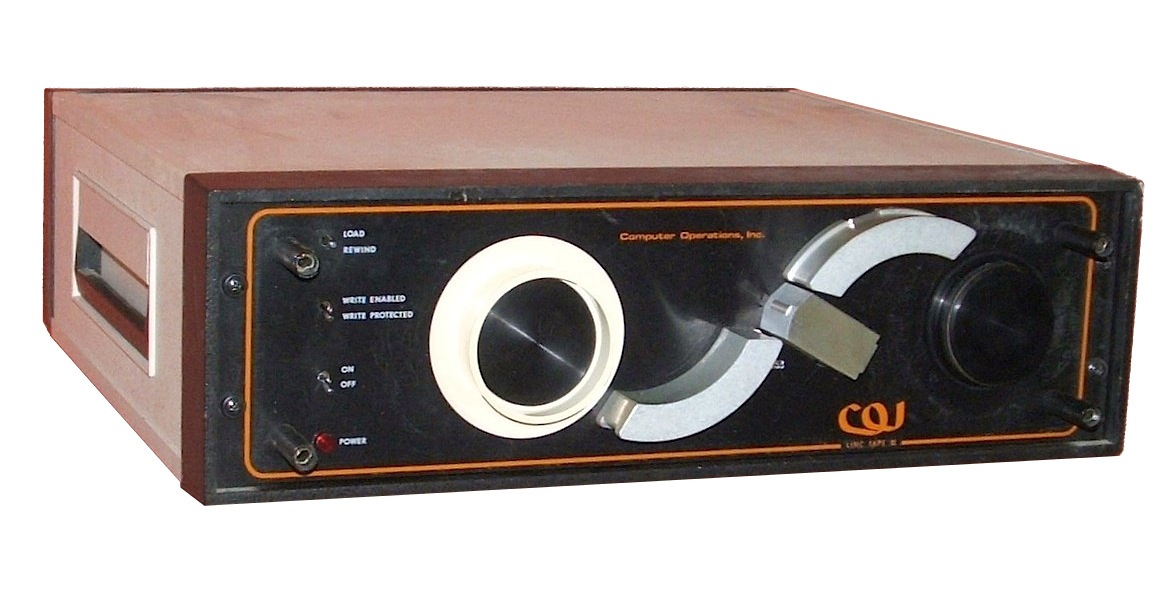
COI LINC Tape II drive

Computer Operations Inc (COI) of Beltsville, Maryland offered a DECtape clone in the 1970s. Initially, COI offered LINC-tape drives for computers made by Data General, Hewlett-Packard and Varian, with only passing reference to its similarity to DECtape. While DECtape and LINC tape are physically interchangeable, the data format COI initially used for 16-bit minicomputers was distinct from both the format used by the LINC and the format used on DECtape. When COI offered the LINC Tape II with support for the DEC PDP-8, PDP-11, Data General Nova, Interdata 7/32, HP 2100, Honeywell 316 and several other computers in 1974, the drive was priced at $1,995 and was explicitly advertised as being DECtape compatible.

In 1974, DEC charged COI with patent infringement. COI, in turn, filed a suit claiming that DEC's patent was invalid on several grounds, including the assertions that DEC had marketed DECtape-based equipment for over a year before filing for the patent, that they had failed to properly disclose the prior art, and that the key claims in the DEC patent were in the public domain. The US Patent and Trademark Office ruled DEC's patent invalid in 1978. The court case continued into the 1980s.

== DECtape II ==
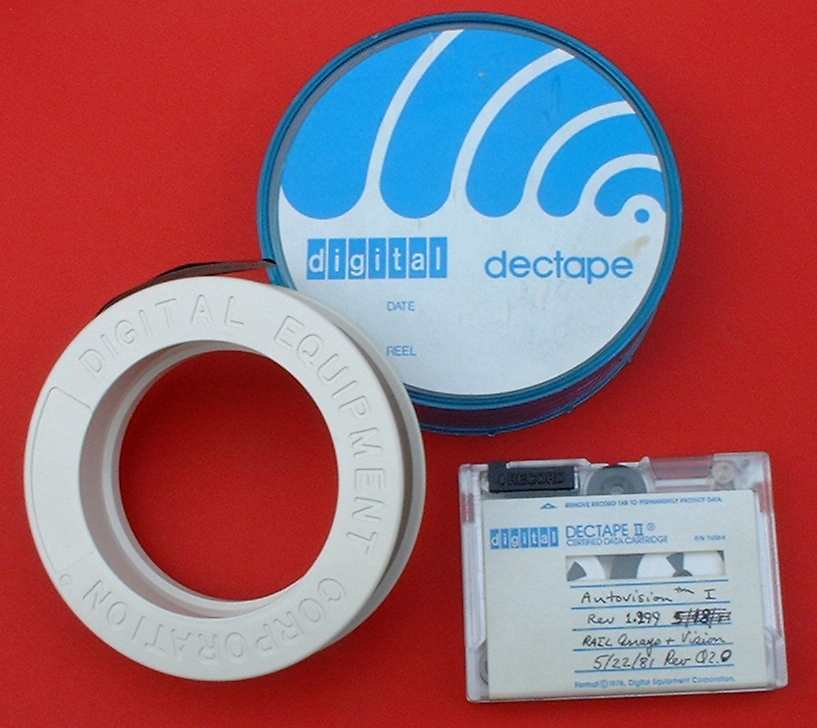
DECtape (top and lower left) and DECtape II (lower right) removable magnetic media

DECtape II was introduced around 1978 and has a similar block structure, but uses a much smaller 0.150 in (3.8 mm) tape (the same width as an audio compact cassette). The tape is packaged in a special, pre-formatted DC150 miniature cartridge consisting of a clear plastic cover mounted on a textured aluminum plate. Cartridge dimensions are 2 3/8 by 3 3/16 by 1/2 inch (60 mm × 81 mm × 13 mm). The TU58 DECtape II drive has an RS-232 serial interface, allowing it to be used with the ordinary serial ports that are very common on Digital's contemporary processors.

Because of its low cost, $562 in bulk and $1750 retail, the TU58 was fitted to several different systems (including the VT103, PDP-11/24 and /44 and the VAX-11/730 and /750) as a DEC-standard device for software product distribution, and for loading diagnostic programs and microcode. The first version of the TU58 imposed very severe timing constraints on the unbuffered UARTs then being used by Digital, but a later firmware revision eased the flow-control problems. The RT11 single-user operating system can be bootstrapped from a TU58, but the relatively slow access time of the tape drive makes use of the system challenging to an impatient user.

Like its predecessor DECtape, and like the faster RX01 floppies used on the VAX-11/780, a DECtape II cartridge has a capacity of about 256 kilobytes. Unlike the original DECtape media, DECtape II cartridges cannot be formatted on the tape drive transports sold to end-users, and have to be purchased in a factory pre-formatted state.

The TU58 is also used with other computers, such as the Automatix Autovision machine vision system and AI32 robot controller. TU58 driver software is available for modern PCs running DOS.

Early production TU58s suffered from some reliability and data interchangeability problems, which were eventually resolved. However, rapid advances in low-cost floppy disk technology, which had an inherent speed advantage, soon outflanked the DECtape II and rendered it obsolete.

== See also ==
- LINC – additional material on LINCtape lineage and operation
