= DigiBarn Computer Museum =

Museum in Boulder Creek, California

Coordinates: 39.4857°N 76.6632°W

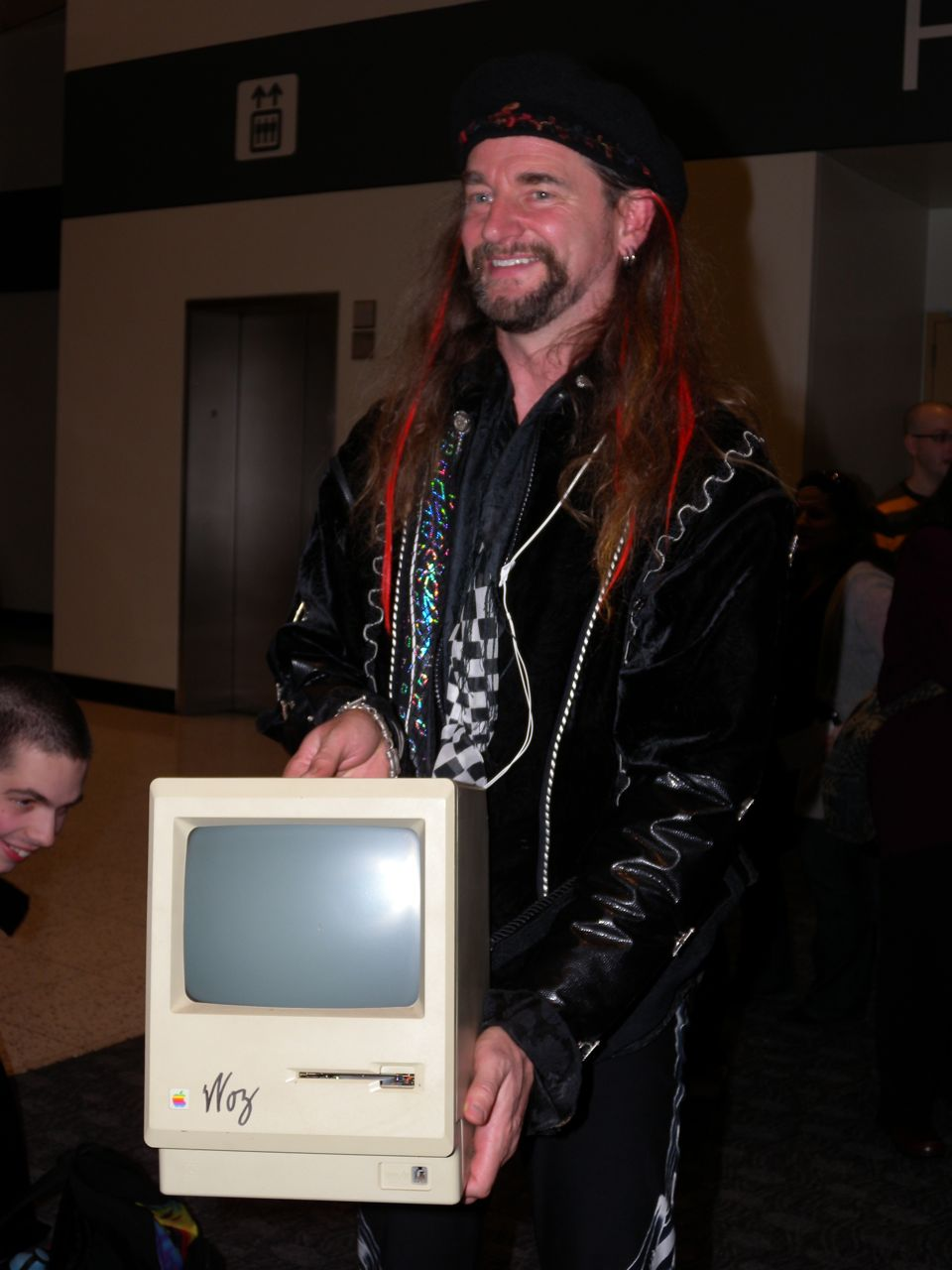
Bruce Damer, cofounder and curator of DigiBarn, poses with an early Macintosh signed by Steve Wozniak during Macworld Expo 2009.

The DigiBarn Computer Museum, or simply DigiBarn, is a computer history museum in Boulder Creek, California, United States. The museum is housed in a 90-year-old barn constructed from old-growth Redwood in the Santa Cruz Mountains, which is adjacent to Silicon Valley. It was co-founded by Bruce Damer and Allan Lundell on May 7, 2001.

The primary focus of the museum's collection is on the birth and evolution of personal, interactive computing, starting with the LINC (1962), considered by some to be the first true personal computer, and leading on up through the homebrew microcomputer revolution of the 1970s, the propagation of personal computing to homes and businesses in the 1980s and the spread of networked computing in the 1990s. The Digibarn does have a few large machines on display such as a Cray-1 supercomputer. One notable point is that a large number of the Digibarn artifacts are available to visitors in a hands-on fashion, allowing them to boot up, load software and interact with the machines.

The Digibarn collection has mainly been donated by individuals and companies in nearby Silicon Valley and around the world. The Digibarn has a major focus on the legacy of Xerox and the birth of the graphical user interface with a large collection of Apple products, although other historic computer systems are featured, including the Atari 400, Osborne 1, Kaypro II and the IBM 5150 (IBM PC).

As of December 2021, most of the collection is on a long-term loan at the System Source Computer Museum.
