= TX-2 Tape System =

Computer magnetic tape data storage format

The TX-2 Tape System was a magnetic tape data storage technology from the late 1950s. It is the direct ancestor of LINCtape, used on the LINC laboratory computer.

The tape transports used in the system were made as simple and fool-proof as possible, consisting of a read-write head assembly, two reel drive motors, and a tape guide. The tape system used 10 tracks across a 1/2-inch (13 mm) tape on 10-inch (250 mm) reels. Maximum reel speed was 920 inches per second (23.4 metres per second). The system used digital speed control based on a clock track on the tape.

The 10-track head assembly contains five channels; three information, one timing, and one block mark. Each channel consists of two redundantly paired tracks, and the paired tracks are nonadjacent to minimize the effect of contamination on the tape surface.

This redundant track scheme was previously used on the MIT Whirlwind tape system.
