= System Source Computer Museum =

Computer Museum in Hunt Valley, Maryland, U.S.

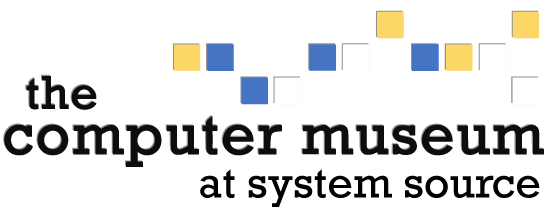

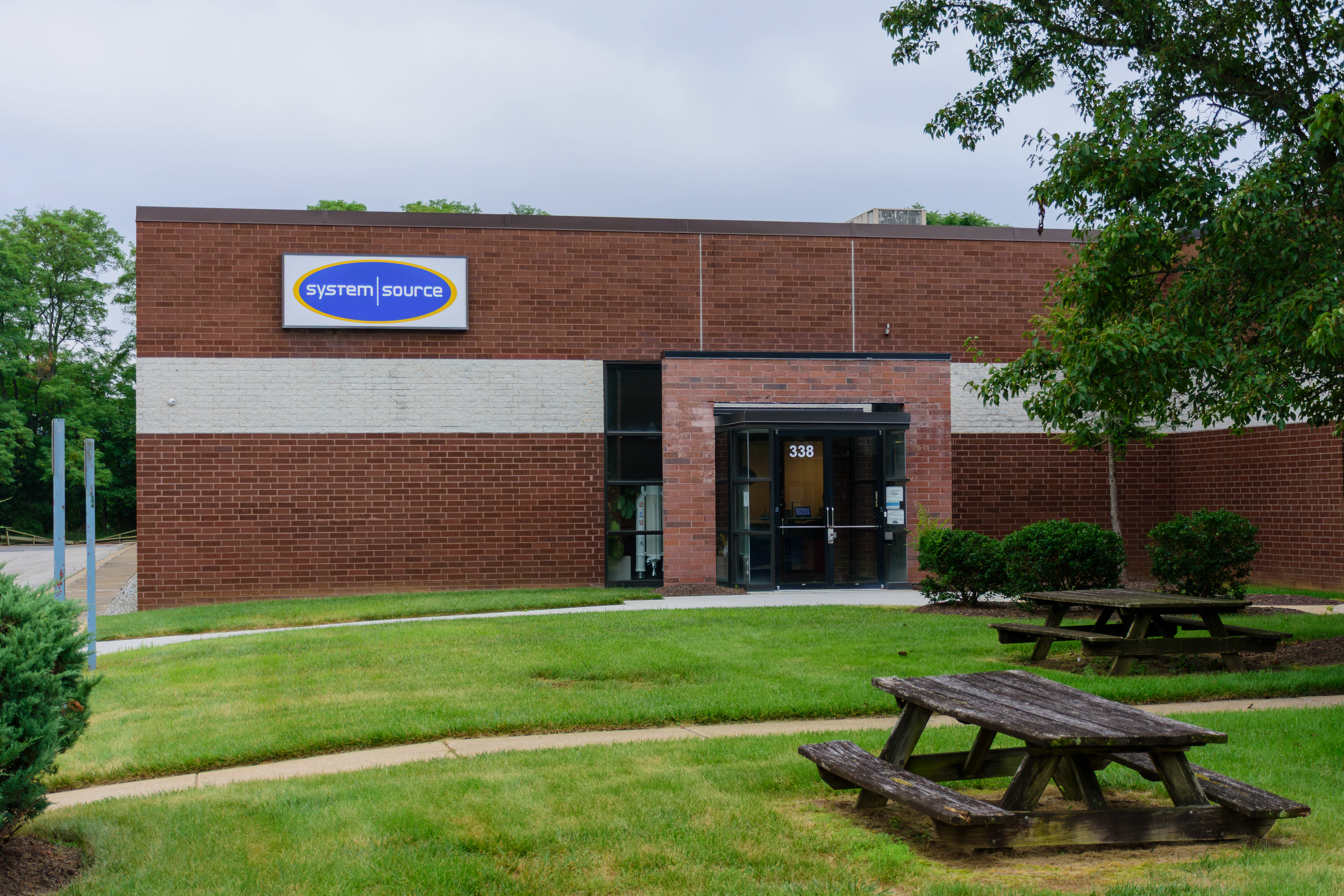
- Exterior of System Source, which houses the computer museum.
- Established: 1981; 45 years ago
- Location: Hunt Valley, Maryland, U.S.
- Coordinates: 39.48610°N 76.66306°W
- Website: museum.syssrc.com

The System Source Computer Museum, located in Hunt Valley, Maryland, USA, exhibits notable computing devices from ancient times until the present. Over 5,000 objects are on display and many of the computational devices are operational. STEM activities are offered to organized tour groups. Admission is $15 for adults, $10 for students, children, veterans, and first responders. The museum is open weekdays from 9:00am until 6:00pm by appointment. Museum docents are available to lead tours. Until January 30, 2026, the National Electronics Museum was in the same building.

== History ==
The museum's origins date to 1981 when a Baltimore ComputerLand franchise had computers in inventory that instantly became historic artifacts with the introduction of the IBM Personal Computer.

The museum was incorporated as a non-profit 501(c)(3) in 2018 as the Maryland Technology Museum with the trade name the System Source Computer Museum. In 2021, the museum became the new home of the DigiBarn Computer Museum.

== Exhibits ==
- Apples: Apple I, Apple II, Apple ///, Apple Lisa and most other Apple products
- Bendix: A Bendix G-15 restored to working order.
- Control Data Corporation: CDC 160 Series
- Cray computers: Cray-1, Cray-2, Cray T90
- DEC computers: PDP-5, PDP-8, LINC PDP-12, VAX
- Computer memory: Delay-line memory Magnetic-core memory
- Kenbak-1: Kenbak-1
- Pre-industrial computers: Abacus, Quipu, Napier's bones, slide rule
- Tic-Tac-Toe and computers: Charles Babbage's research on the game, Relay Tic Tac Toe Machine, Matchbox Educable Noughts and Crosses Engine (MENACE)
- UNIVAC: UNIVAC 490, UNIVAC 418
- Xerox: Xerox Alto
- IBM: Two IBM System/360 Model 20s on long-term loan from a private collection in the UK.

== Photos ==
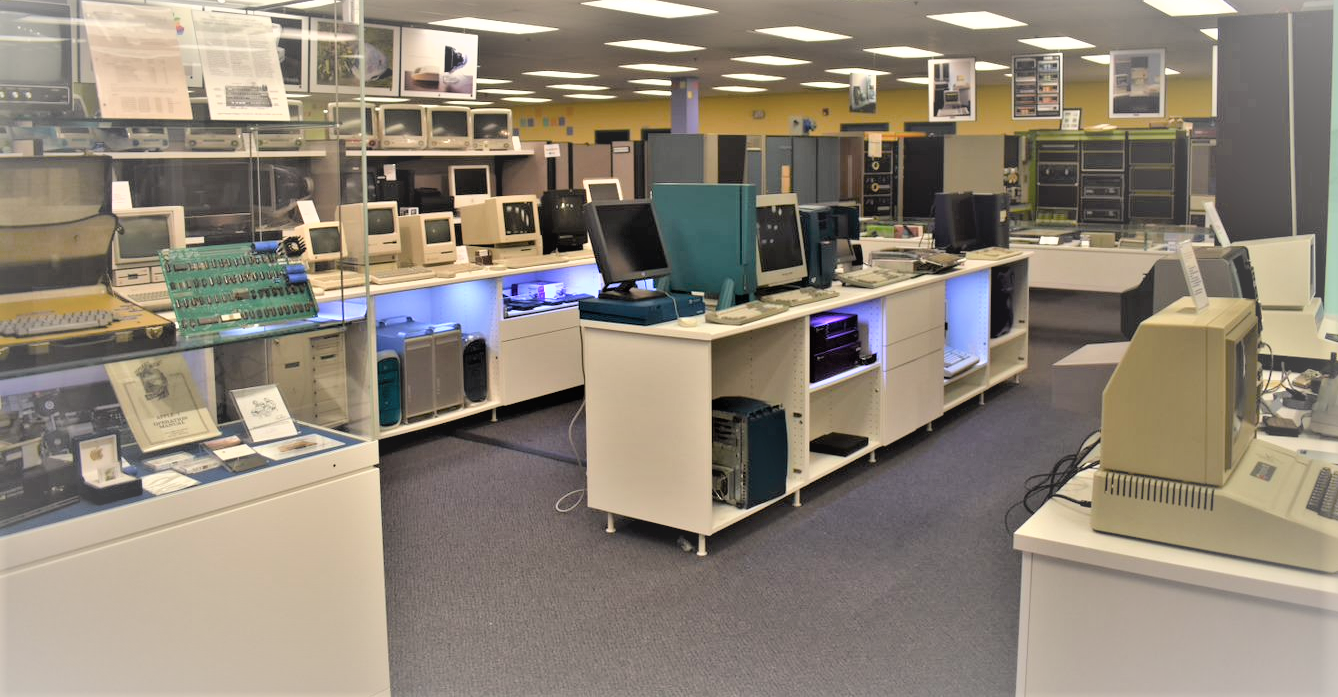
Museum's main gallery, with many working vintage computers available for use.

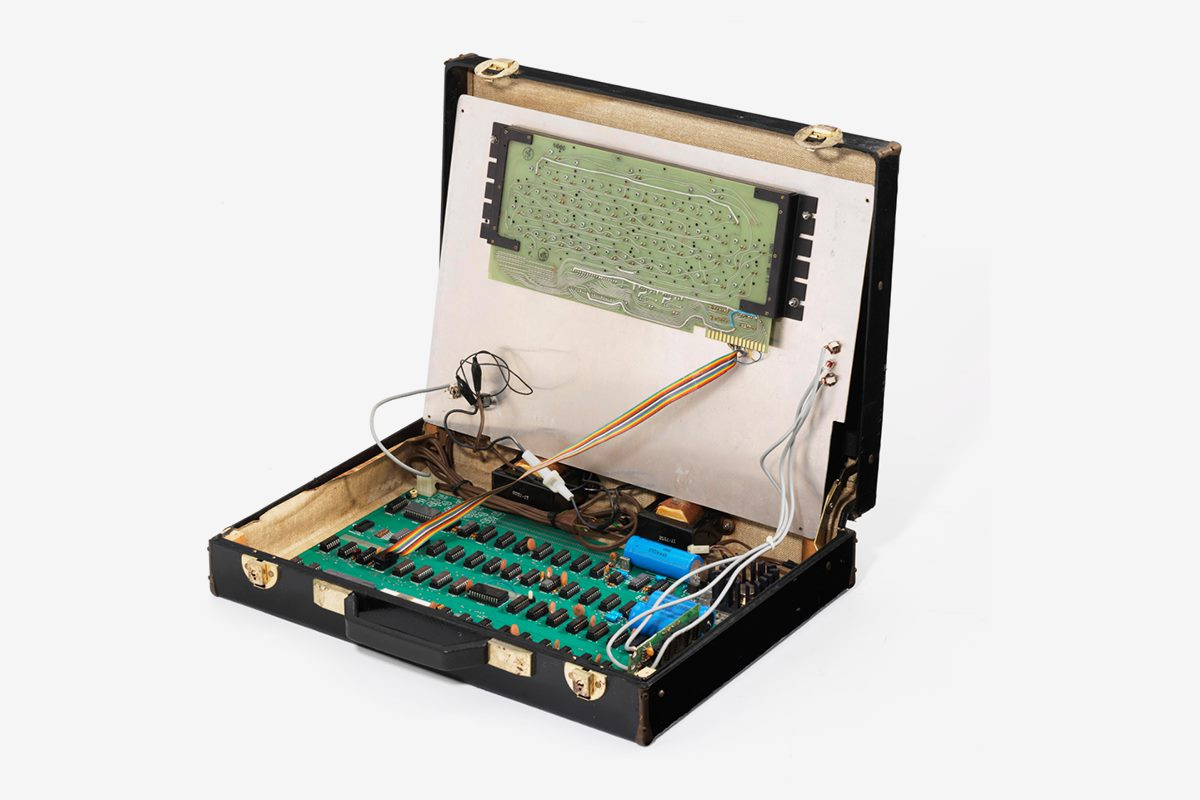
Apple I #10 The Briefcase Apple on display

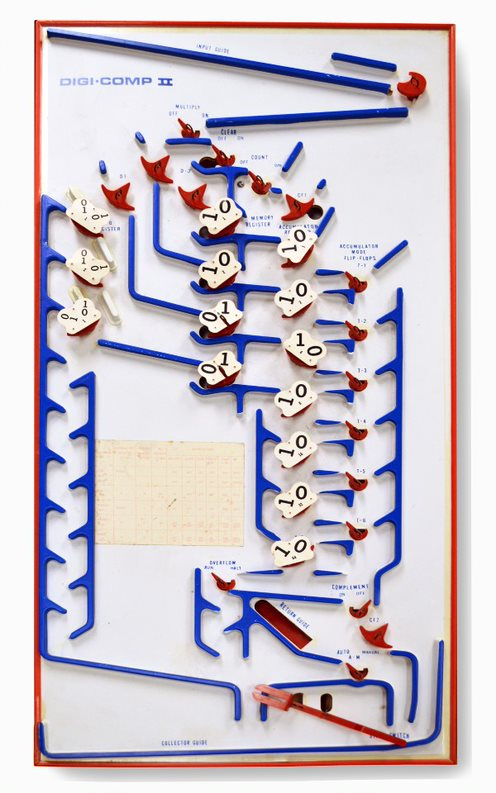
Digi-Comp II on display

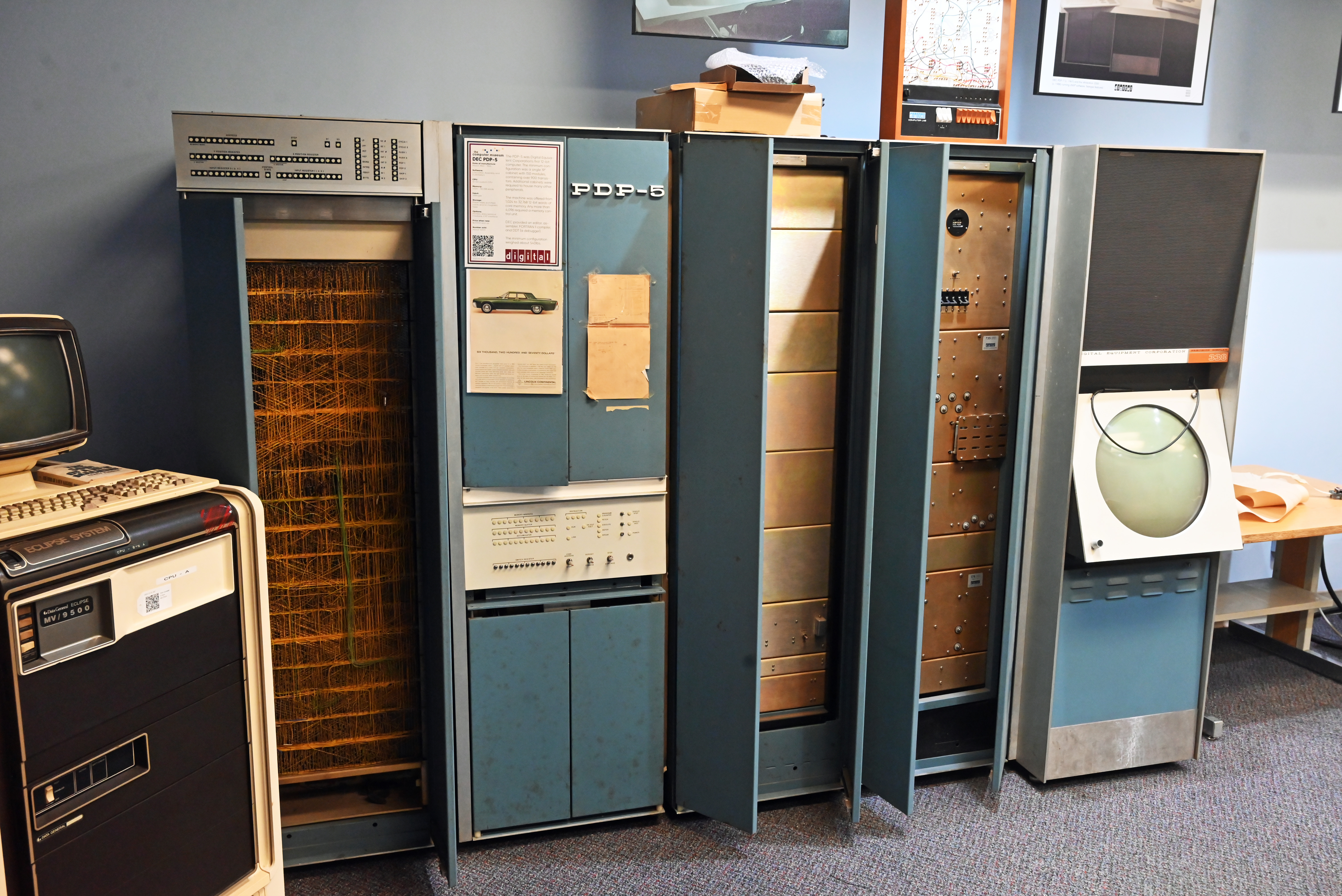
PDP-5

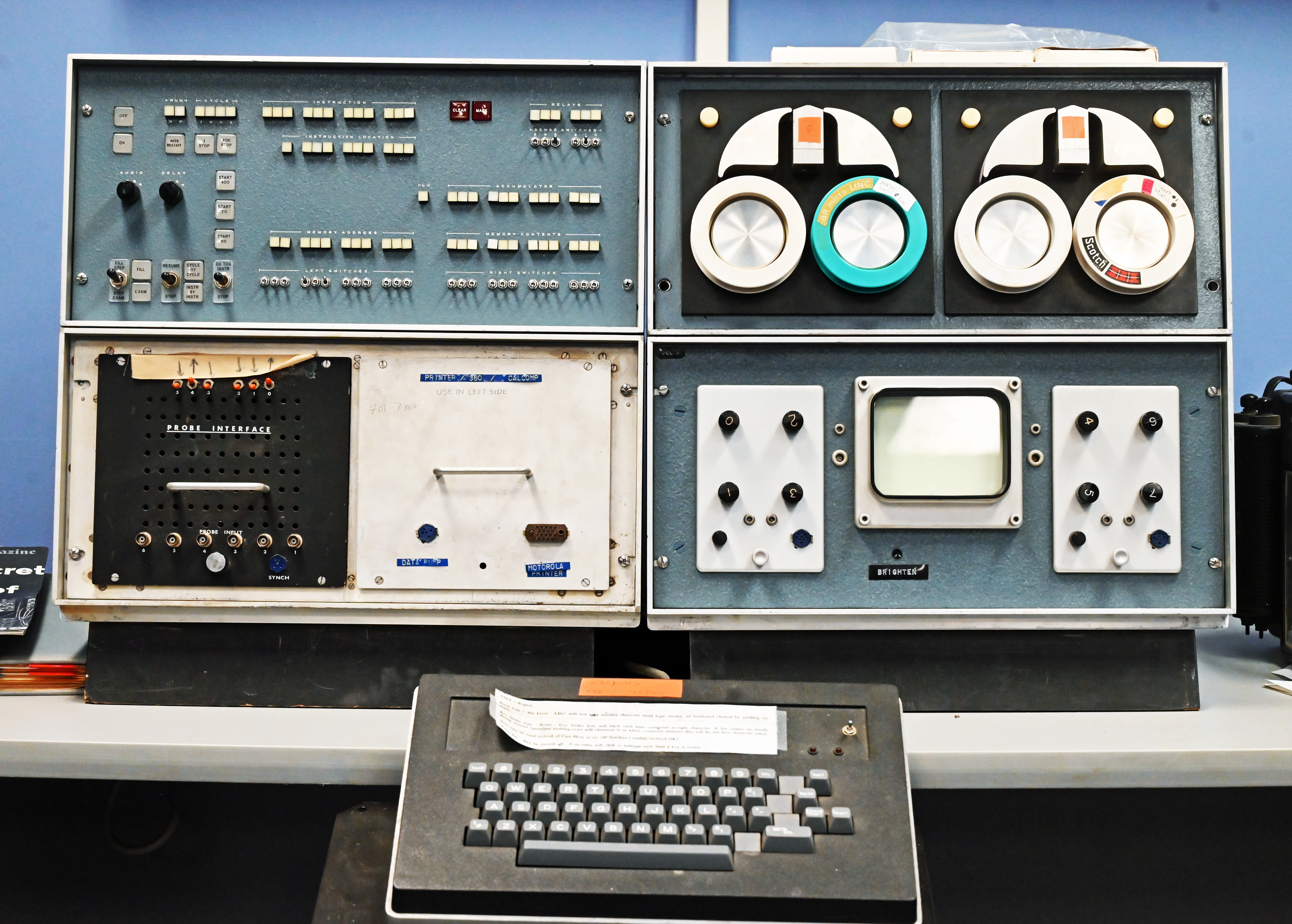
LINC console

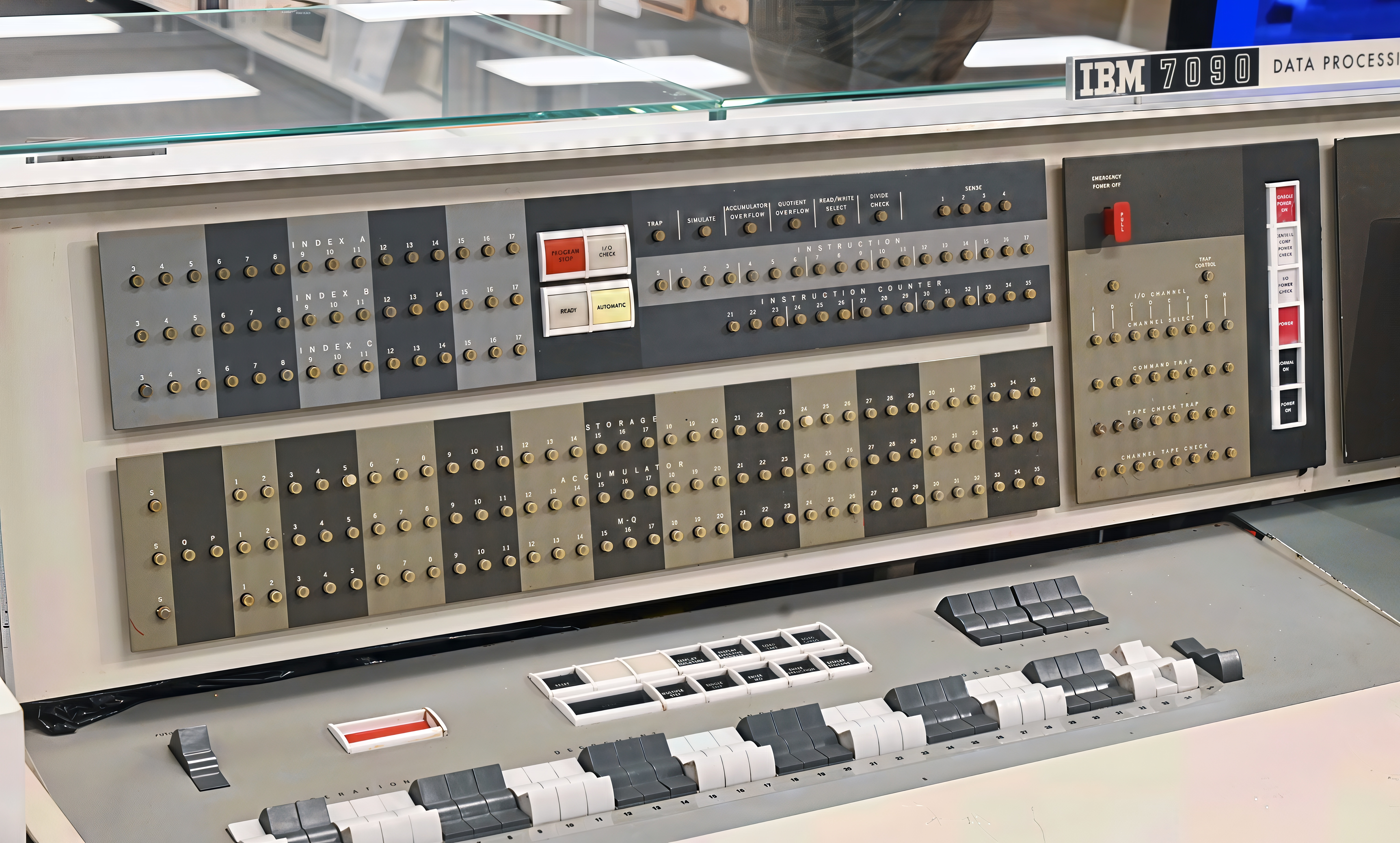
IBM 7090 console

== Video ==
The Bendix G-15 was restored to working order and demonstrated in December 2025.

== STEM programs ==
- Hardware Workshop
- Programming a Virtual PET
- Squeak (Etoys Programming)
