= Dial box =

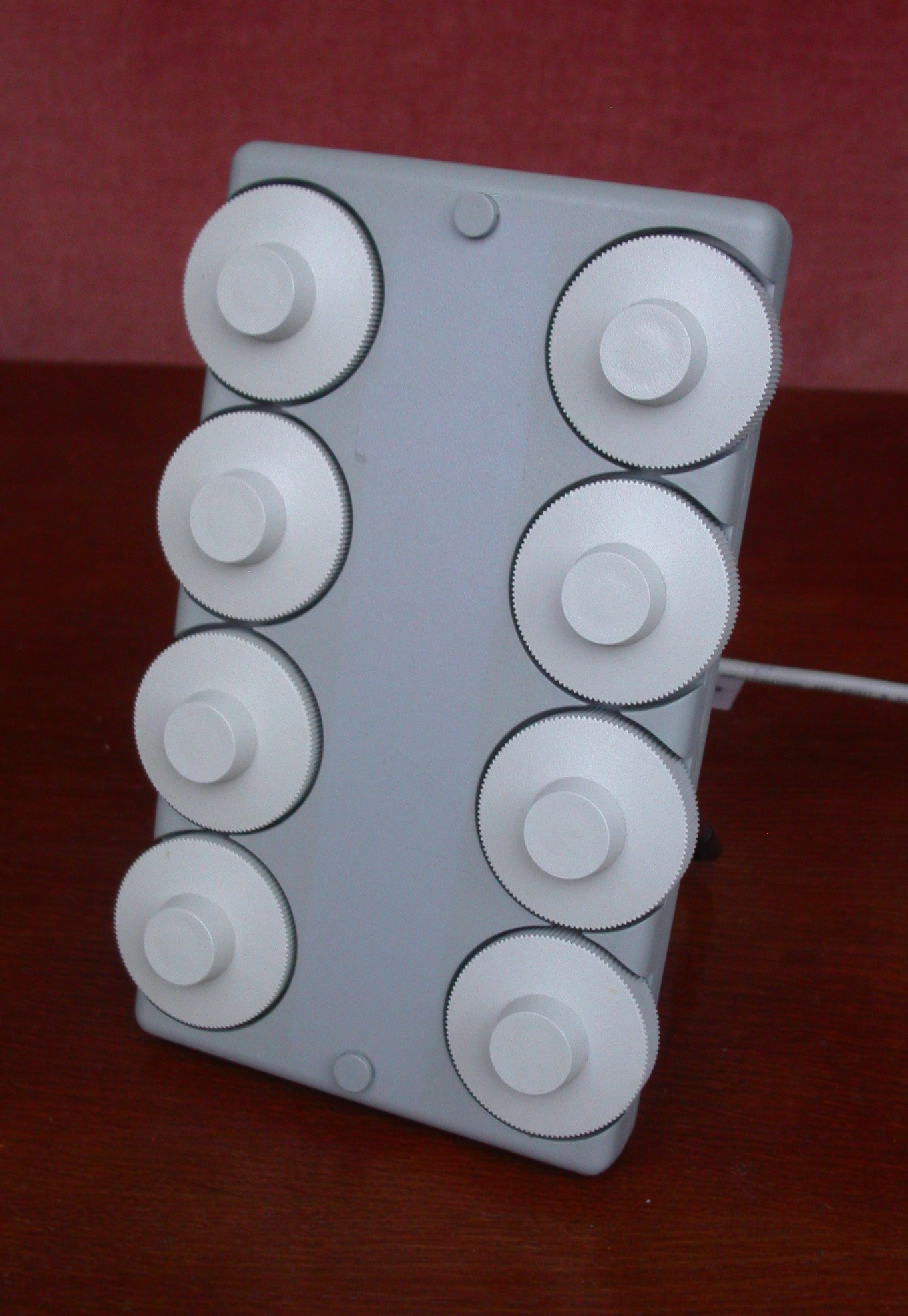
SGI model DLS80-1022 dial box made by Danaher controls

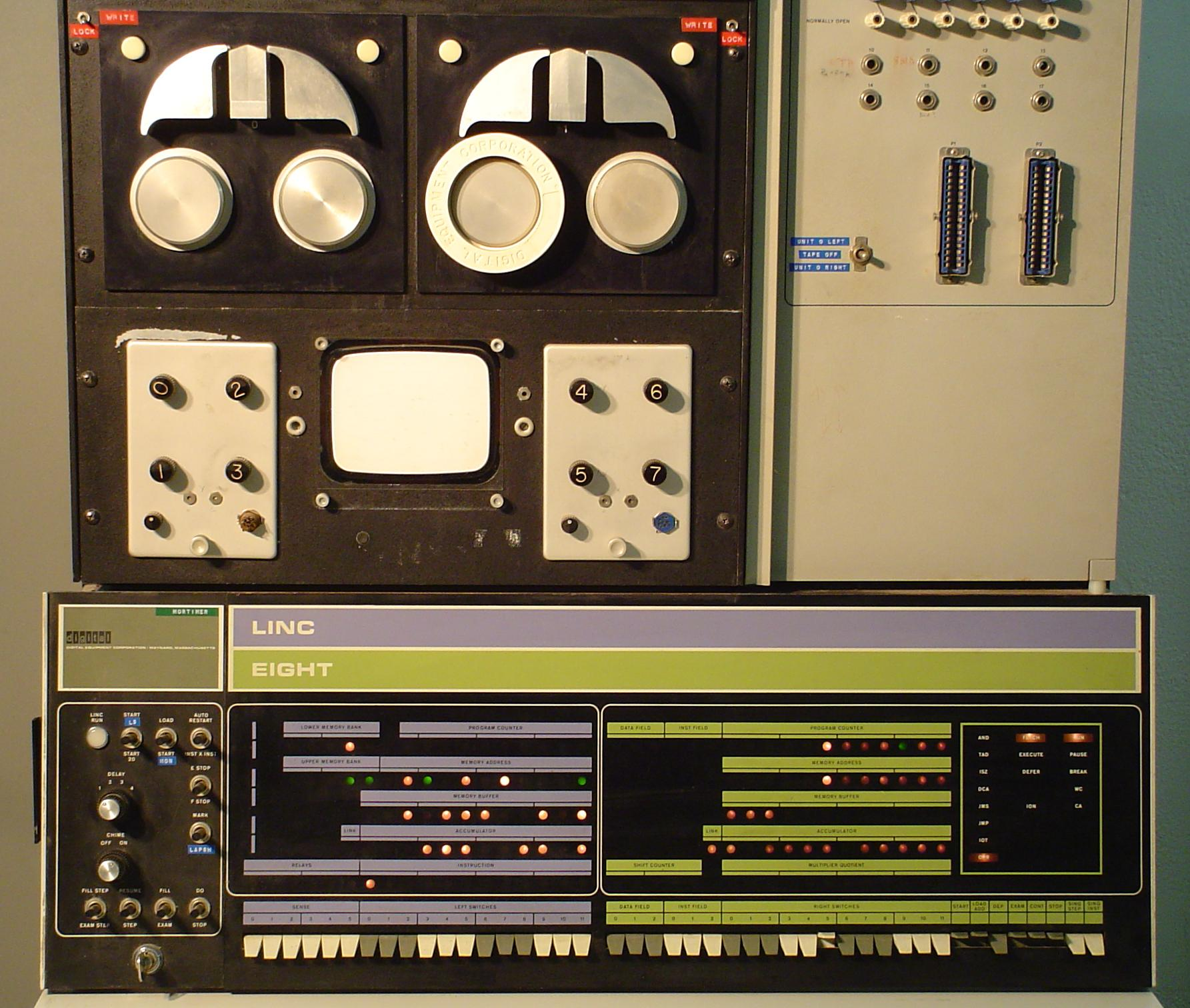
The LINC computer had a set of 8 knobs forming a rudimentary built-in dial box.

A dial box is a computer peripheral for direct 3D manipulation e.g. to interactively input the rotation and torsion angles of a model displayed on a computer screen. Dial boxes were common input tools in the first years of interactive 3D graphics and they were available for Silicon Graphics (SGI) or Sun Microsystems and sold with their workstations. Currently they have been replaced by standard computer mouse interaction techniques.

A standard dial box has eight jog wheels mounted on a plate. The plate is set upright with the help of a stand and usually located next to the computer screen for convenient access. The connection to a computer is made via the serial port (RS-232).

One of the fields of application for dial boxes was molecular graphics.

== Dial box models ==
At least two different models of dial boxes were sold with the SGI brand.

DLS80-1022 (SGI part number 9980992) was made by Danaher controls, has 8 large dials and a single DE-9 connector which contains both the power and data pins. The connection to the computer serial port the dial box power supply is made with a special DE-9 – DE-9, DIN-5 splitter cable. Essentially the same dial box was also sold as the Sun Microsystems DLS80-1012, part number 370-1223-01.

The Japanese made SGI SN-921 (type number 9780804) has somewhat smaller dials. It has a separate 5 V power supply connector in addition to the DE-9 serial connector, but it also needs a serial cable with a custom pinout.

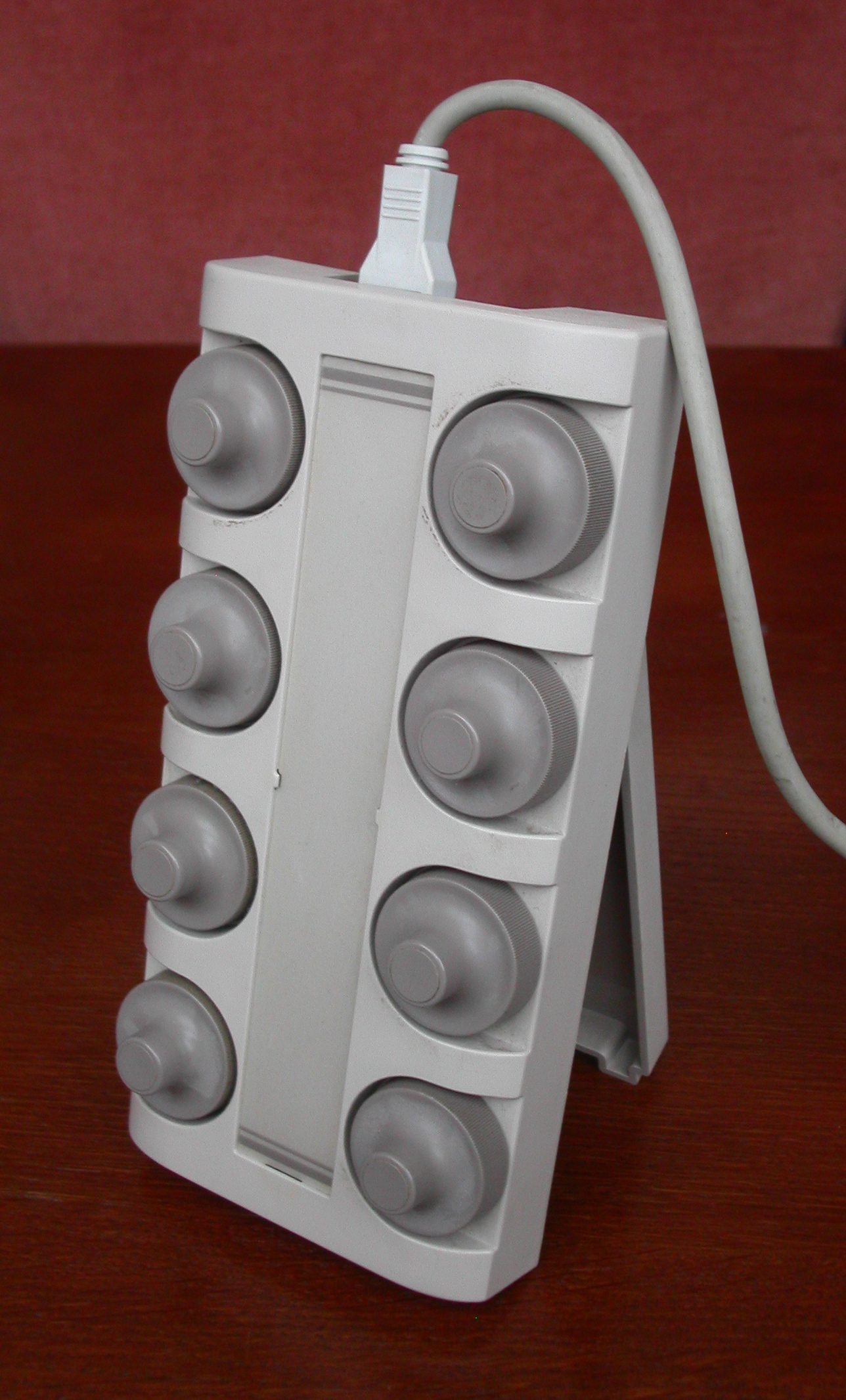
SGI dial box model SN-921, type no. 9780804

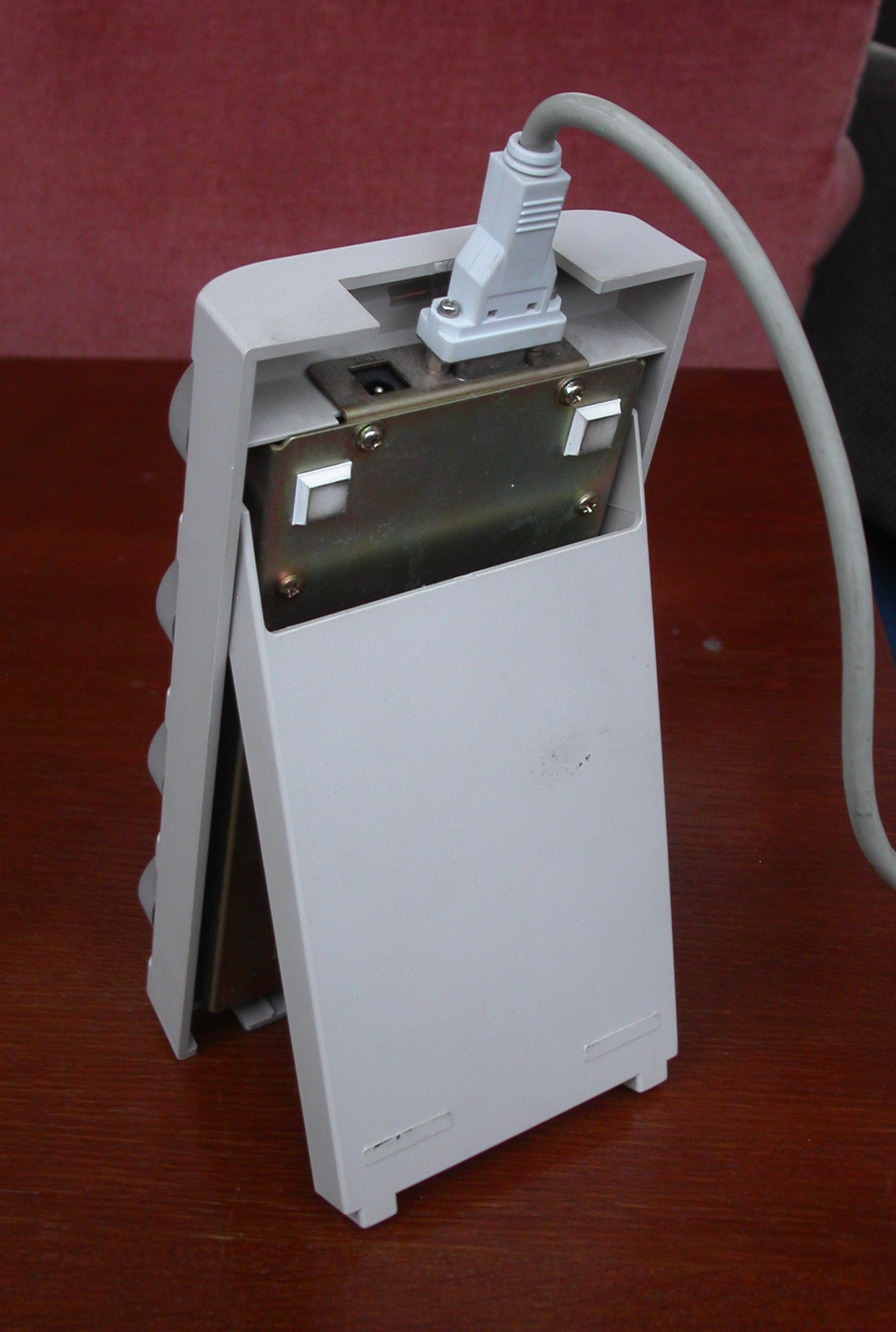
SGI dial box model SN-921, type no. 9780804

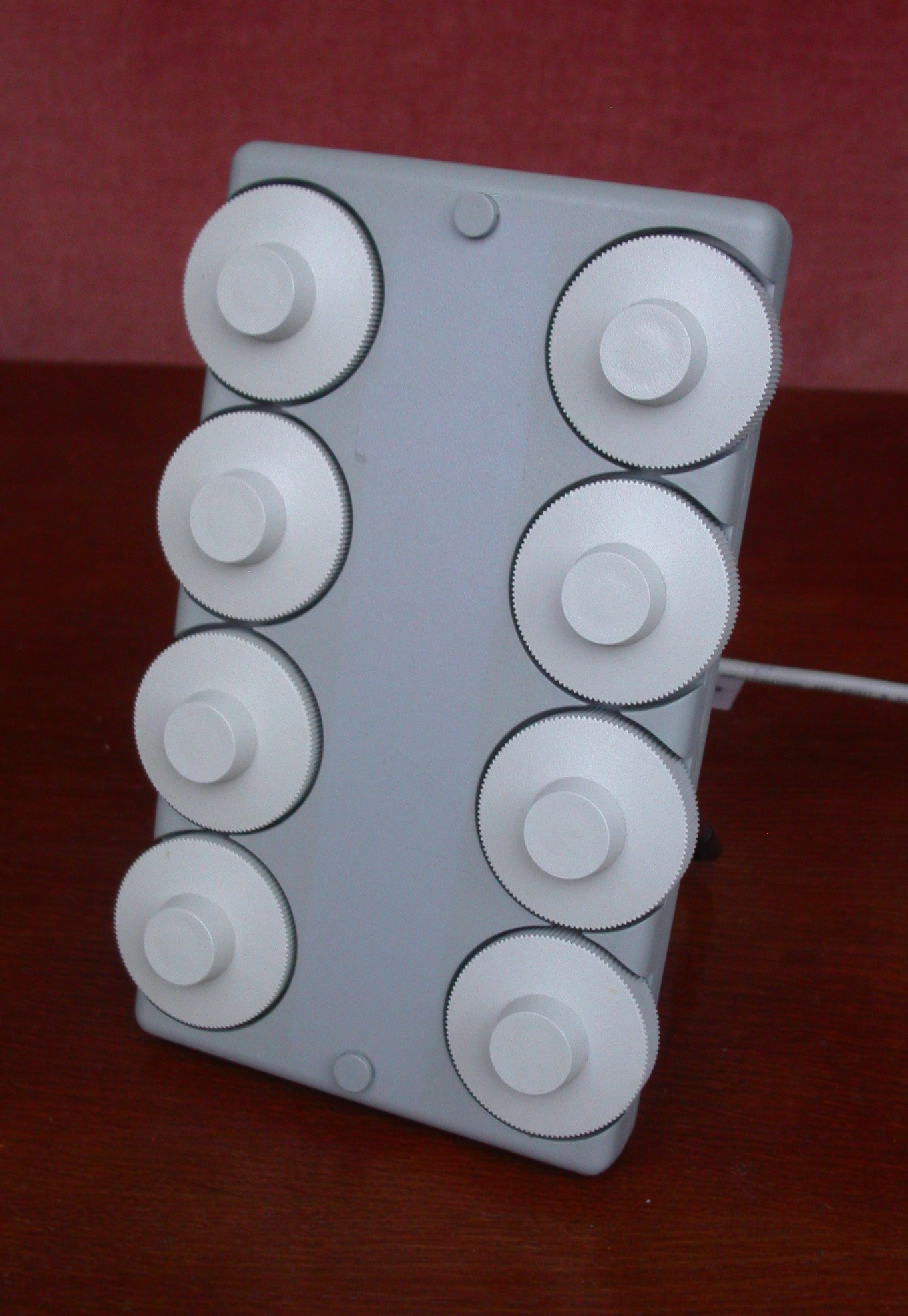
SGI dial box model DLS80-1022, part no. 9980992

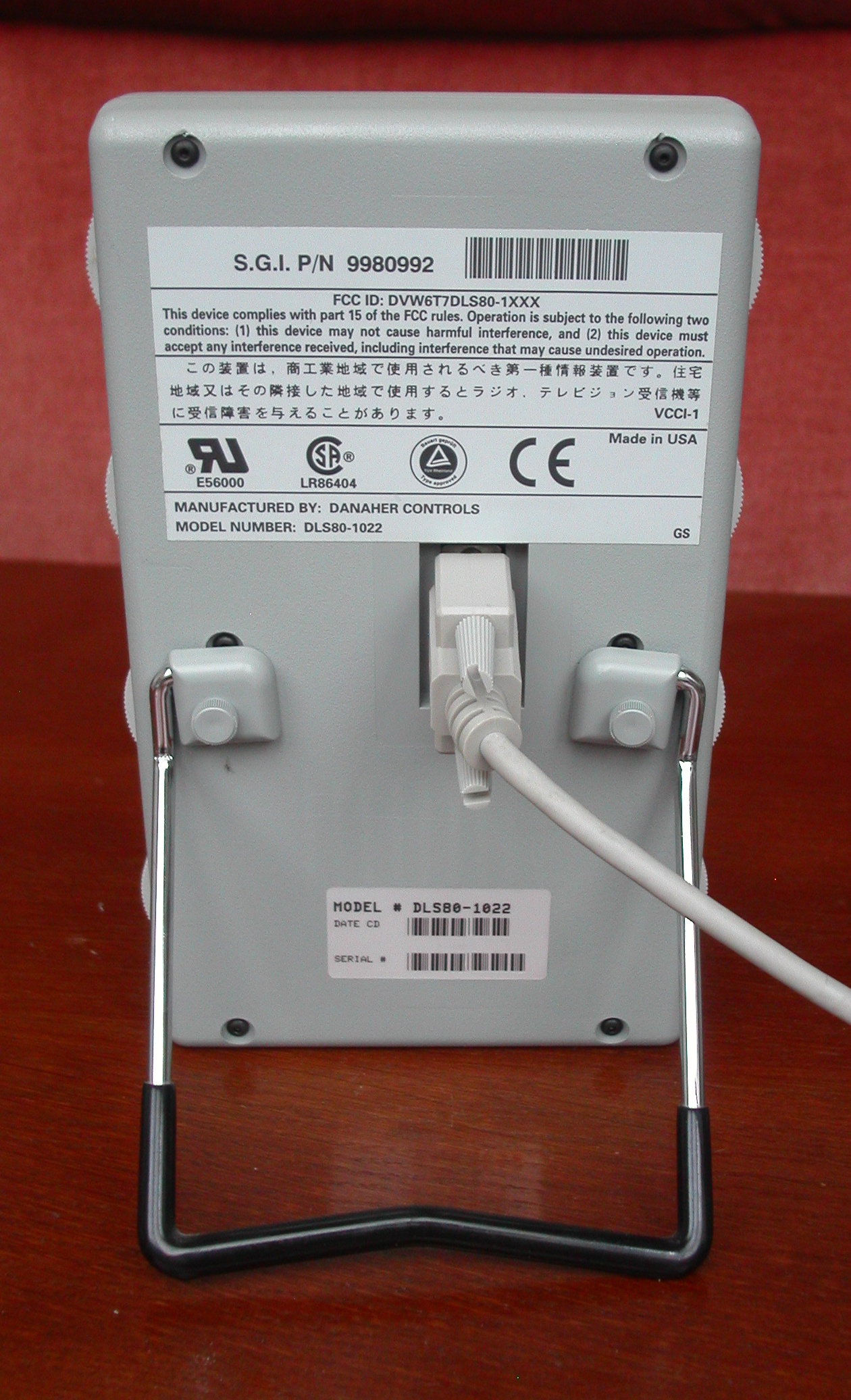
SGI dial box model DLS80-1022, part no. 9980992

== See also ==
- Jog dial
