= TX-2 =

Early transistorized computer

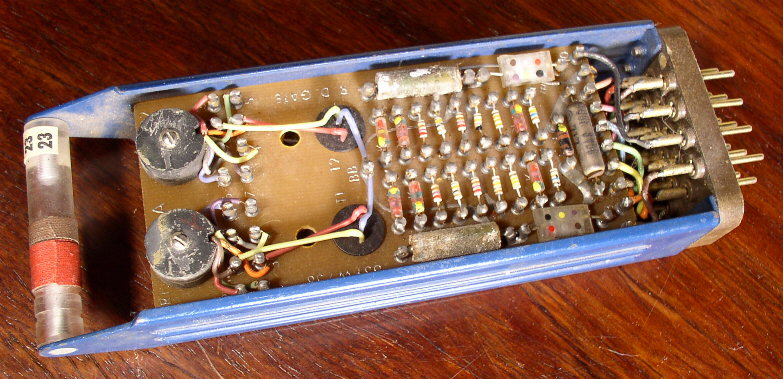
- Circuit module from the TX-2
- Developer: MIT Lincoln Laboratory
- Product family: TX
- Released: 1958
- Predecessor: TX-0

The MIT Lincoln Laboratory TX-2 computer was the successor to the Lincoln TX-0 and was known for its role in advancing both artificial intelligence and human–computer interaction. Wesley A. Clark was the chief architect of the TX-2.

== Specifications ==
The TX-2 was a transistor-based computer using the then-huge amount of 64K 36-bit words of magnetic-core memory. The TX-2 became operational in 1958. Because of its powerful capabilities, Ivan Sutherland's revolutionary Sketchpad program was developed for and ran on the TX-2. One of its key features was the ability to directly interact with the computer through a graphical display.

The TX-2 had 32 modes of predication, innovative bitmanipulation instructions and is likely one of the very first processors with SIMD within a register, used in Sutherland's Sketchpad:

...the Lincoln Lab’s TX-2 computer offered instructions that operated on the ALU as either one 36-bit operation, two 18-bit operations, or four 9-bit operations... Sketchpad did in fact take advantage of these SIMD instructions, despite TX-2 appearing before invention of the term SIMD.

The compiler (today we would say assembler) was developed by Lawrence Roberts while he was studying at the MIT Lincoln Laboratory.

In 1964 the TX-2 was extended with the APEX time-sharing system. This included a hardware memory-management unit named SPAN which employed thin-film memory.

== Relationship with DEC ==
Digital Equipment Corporation was a spin-off of the TX-0 and TX-2 projects. The TX-2 Tape System was a block addressable 1/2" tape developed for the TX-2 by Tom Stockebrand which evolved into LINCtape and DECtape.

== Role in creating the Internet ==
Dr. Leonard Kleinrock developed the mathematical theory of packet networks which he successfully simulated on the TX-2 computer at Lincoln Lab.

== Decommissioning ==
TX-2 was taken out of operation and dismantled in 1977.
