= PDP-5 =

12-bit computer from Digital

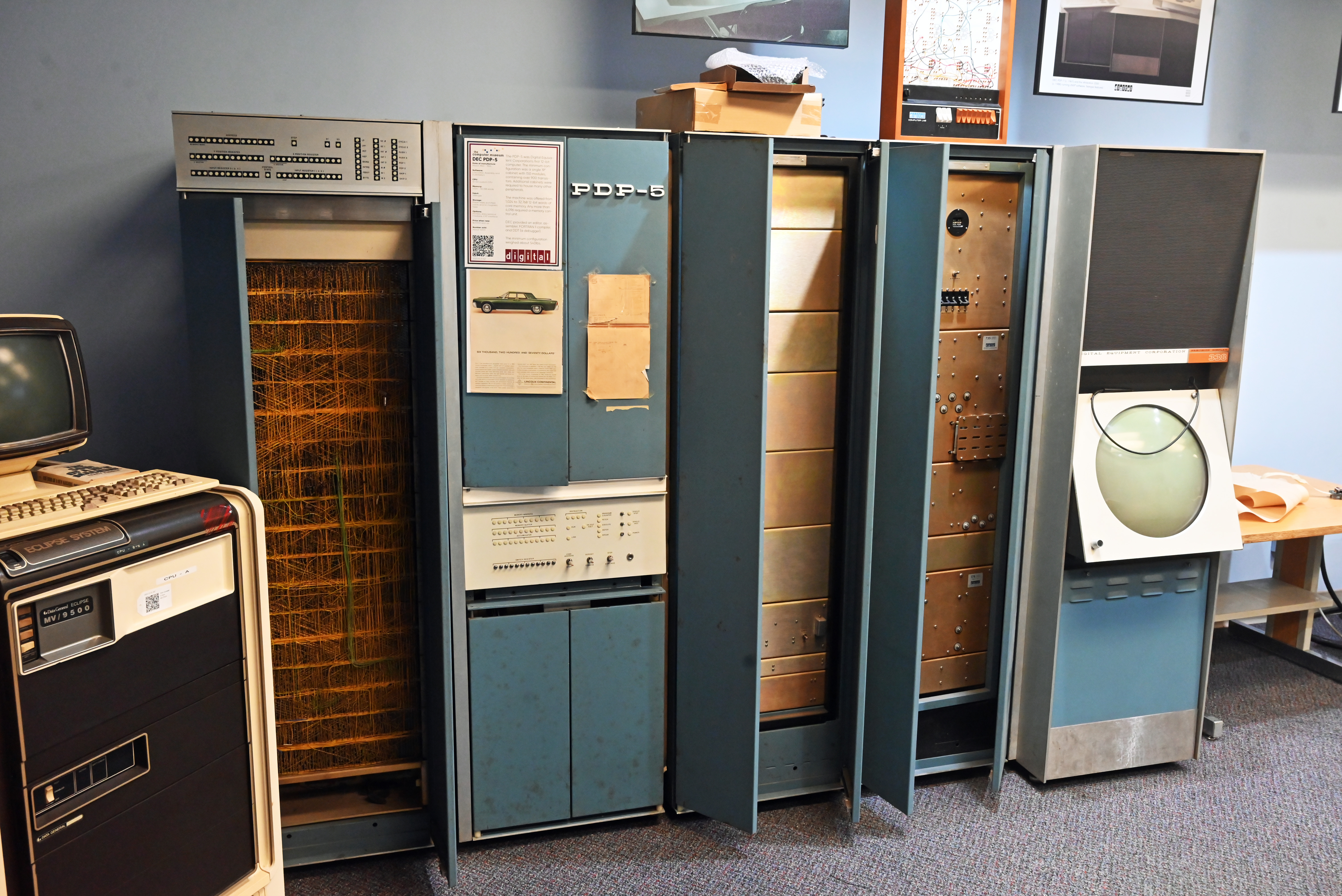
- PDP-5 at the System Source Computer Museum
- Developer: Digital Equipment Corporation
- Product family: Programmed Data Processor
- Type: Minicomputer
- Released: 1963; 63 years ago
- Introductory price: US$27,000 (equivalent to $283,940 in 2025)
- Units sold: about 1,000
- Platform: PDP 12-bit
- Weight: 540 pounds (240 kg)
- Predecessor: LINC
- Successor: PDP-8

The PDP-5 was Digital Equipment Corporation's first 12-bit computer, introduced in 1963.

== History ==
An earlier 12-bit computer, named LINC has been described as the first minicomputer and also "the first modern personal computer." It had 2,048 12-bit words, and the first LINC was built in 1962.

DEC's founder, Ken Olsen, had worked with both it and a still earlier computer, the 18-bit 64,000-word TX-0, at MIT's Lincoln Laboratory.

Neither of these machines was mass-produced.

== Applicability ==
Although the LINC computer was intended primarily for laboratory use, the PDP-5's 12-bit system had a far wider range of use. An example of DEC's "The success of the PDP-5 ... proved that a market for minicomputers did exist" is:

- "Data-processing computers have accomplished for mathematicians what the wheel did for transportation"
- "Very reliable data was obtained with ..."
- "A PDP-5 computer was used very successfully aboard Evergreen for ..."

all of which described the same PDP-5 used by the United States Coast Guard.

The architecture of the PDP-5 was specified by Alan Kotok and Gordon Bell; the principal logic designer was the young engineer Edson de Castro who went on later to found Data General.

== Hardware ==
By contrast with the four-cabinet PDP-1, the minimum configuration of the PDP-5 was a single 19-inch cabinet with "150 printed circuit board modules holding over 900 transistors." The circuit boards used were System Modules. Additional cabinets were required to house many peripheral devices.

The minimum configuration weighed about 540 pounds (240 kg).

The machine was offered with from 1,024 to 32,768 12-bit words of core memory. Addressing more than 4,096 words of memory required the addition of a Type 154 Memory Extension Control unit (in modern terms, a memory management unit); this allowed adding additional Type 155 4,096-word core-memory modules.

=== Instruction set ===
Of the 12 bits in each word, exactly three were used for instruction op-codes.

The PDP-5's instruction set was later expanded in its successor, the PDP-8. The biggest change was that, in the PDP-5, the program counter was stored in memory location zero, while on PDP-8 computers, it was a register inside the CPU. Another significant change was that microcoded instructions on the PDP-5 could not combine incrementing and clearing the accumulator, while these could be combined on the PDP-8. This allowed loading of many small constants in a single instruction on the PDP-8. The PDP-5 was one of the first computer series with more than 1,000 built.

== Software ==
DEC provided an editor, an assembler, a FORTRAN II compiler and DDT (a debugger).

== Marketplace ==
With a base price of $27,000 and designed for those not in need of the 18-bit PDP-4, yet having "applications needing solutions too complicated to be solved efficiently by modules systems" the PDP-5, when introduced in 1963, came at a time when the minicomputer market was gaining a foothold.

== Photos ==
- PDP-5 computer, including Teletype Model 33 ASR
- PDP-5 from Ed Thelen's collection
- Front panel of a PDP-5
