= PDP-12 =

Historical scientific computer

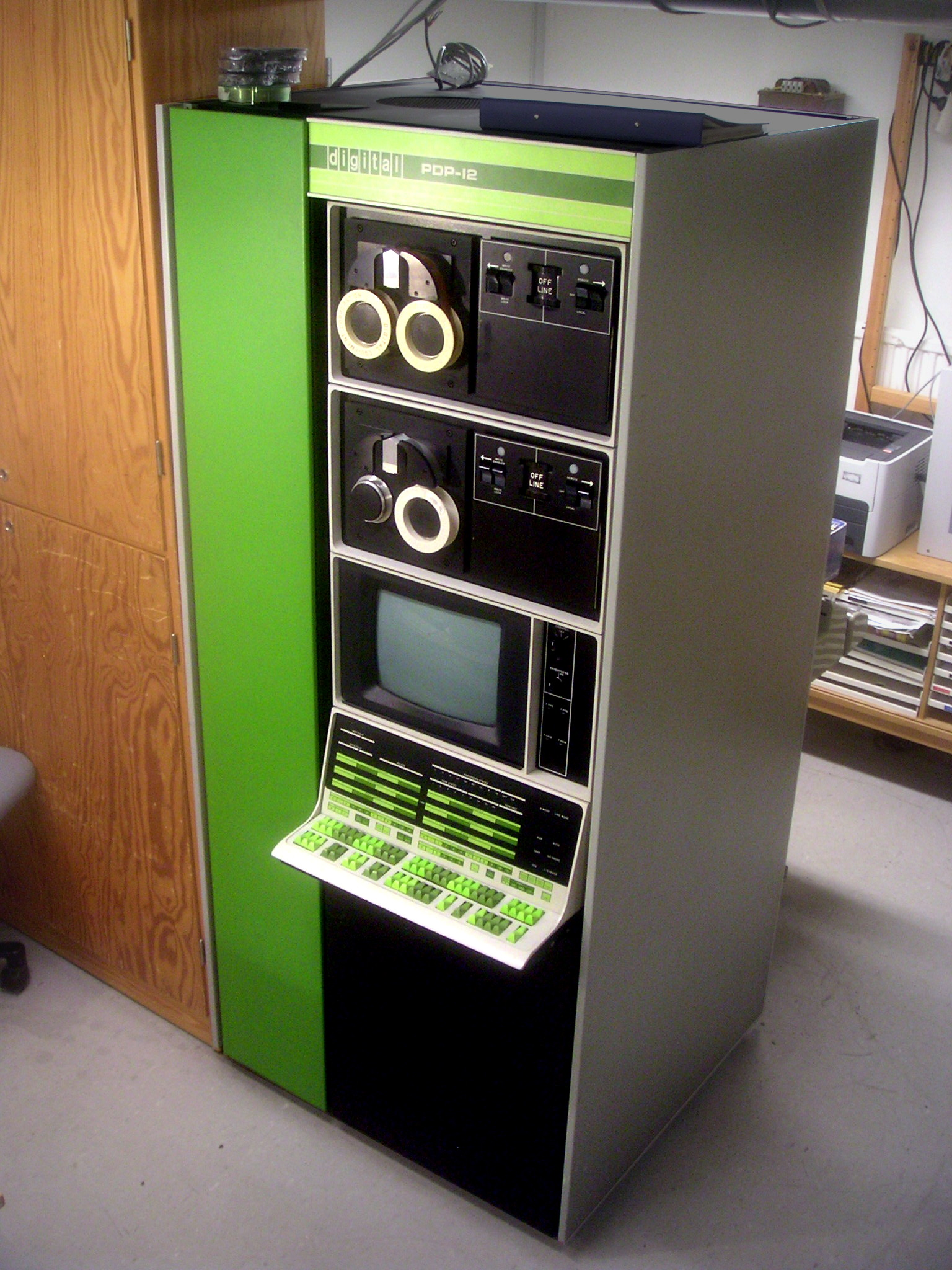
- Manufacturer: Digital Equipment Corporation
- Product family: Programmed Data Processor
- Released: 1969; 57 years ago
- Discontinued: 1972; 54 years ago
- Units sold: 725
- Operating system: OS/8, DIALPS, LAP6W
- Memory: 4k 12-bit words; can be expanded to 32K
- Platform: PDP 12-bit
- Predecessor: PDP-8 and LINC

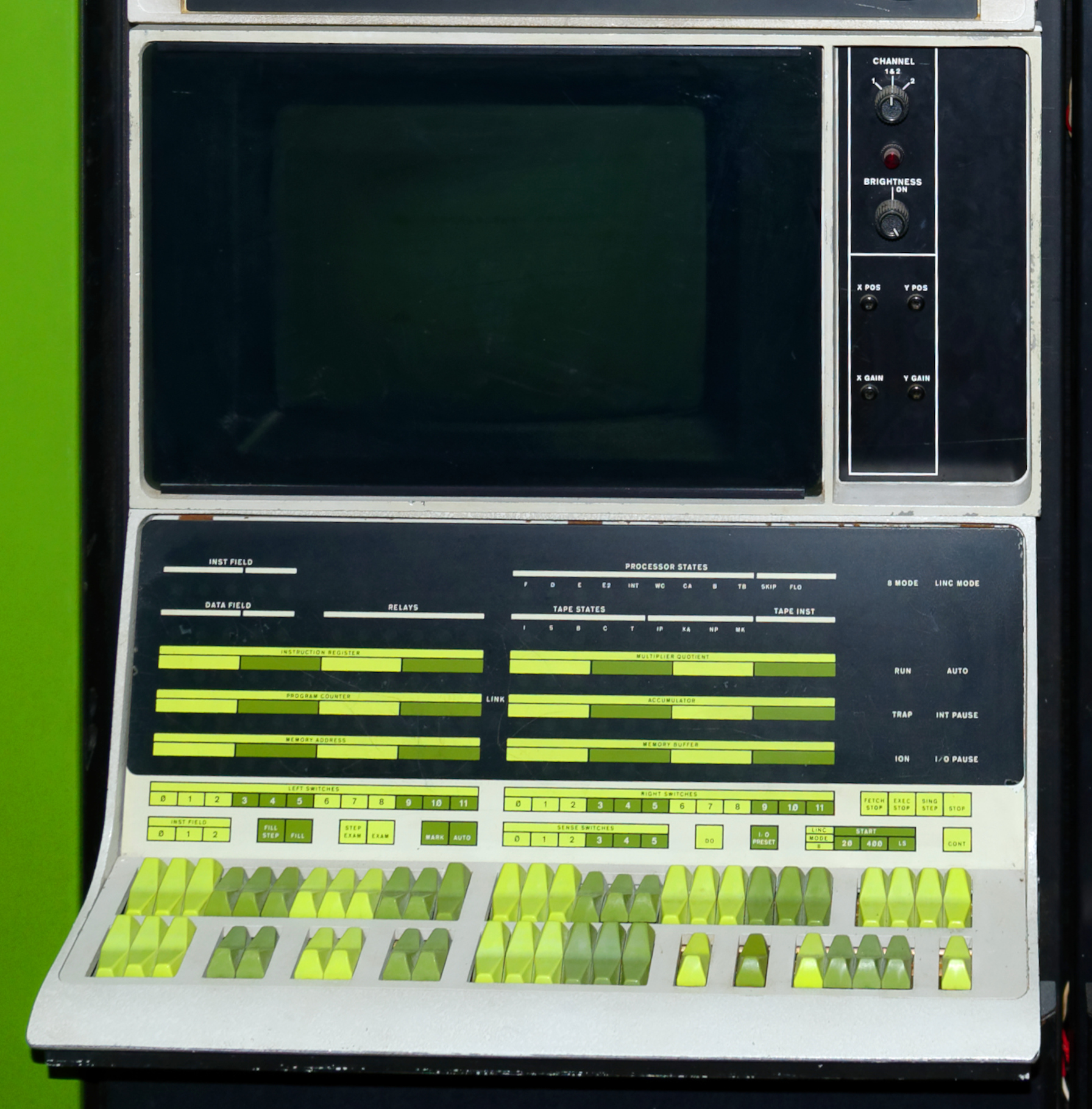
PDP-12 front panel and screen

The PDP-12 (Programmed Data Processor) is a computer that was created by Digital Equipment Corporation (DEC) in 1969 and marketed specifically for science and engineering. It is the third in the LINC family and its main uses were for applications in chemistry, applied psychology, patient monitoring and industrial testing. It is the combination of the LINC computer and the PDP-8 and can run programs for either computer. It features a single central processor with two distinct operating modes, each with its own instruction set that allows it to run both computers' programs. A PDP-12 Basic System weighs about 600 pounds (270 kg).

Because it is the combination of two different computers, it is very versatile. It can be a laboratory-oriented machine with several facilities for I/O, auxiliary storage, and control and sensing for external equipment or a general purpose computer with a flexible I/O capability that can support multiple peripheral devices. The basic package came with dual LINCtape drives, a scope display and I/O ports for interfacing with external laboratory equipment and peripherals. In addition to a display-based OS other software packages were included for data acquisition and display, Fourier analysis and mass spectrometry.

== Operating systems ==
Although an OS/8 variant named OS/12 is the predominant PDP-12 operating system, there were two prior ones:

- LAP6-DIAL (Display Interactive Assembly Language)
- DIAL-MS (Mass Storage; this is an 8K version of LAP6-DIAL)

== Production and training ==
Less than a year after its introduction the PDP-12 already had over 400 orders placed and in total 725 units were manufactured before being discontinued in 1972.

Since it was used as laboratory equipment DEC offered a two-week "hands-on" programming course with the purchase of the computer. Classes were held at the main plant in Maynard, Massachusetts or in Palo Alto, California in the US, and also available in Reading in the United Kingdom, Cologne in Germany or Paris, France.

== See also ==
- LINC
- LINC-8
