= Programmed Data Processor =

Name used for several lines of minicomputers

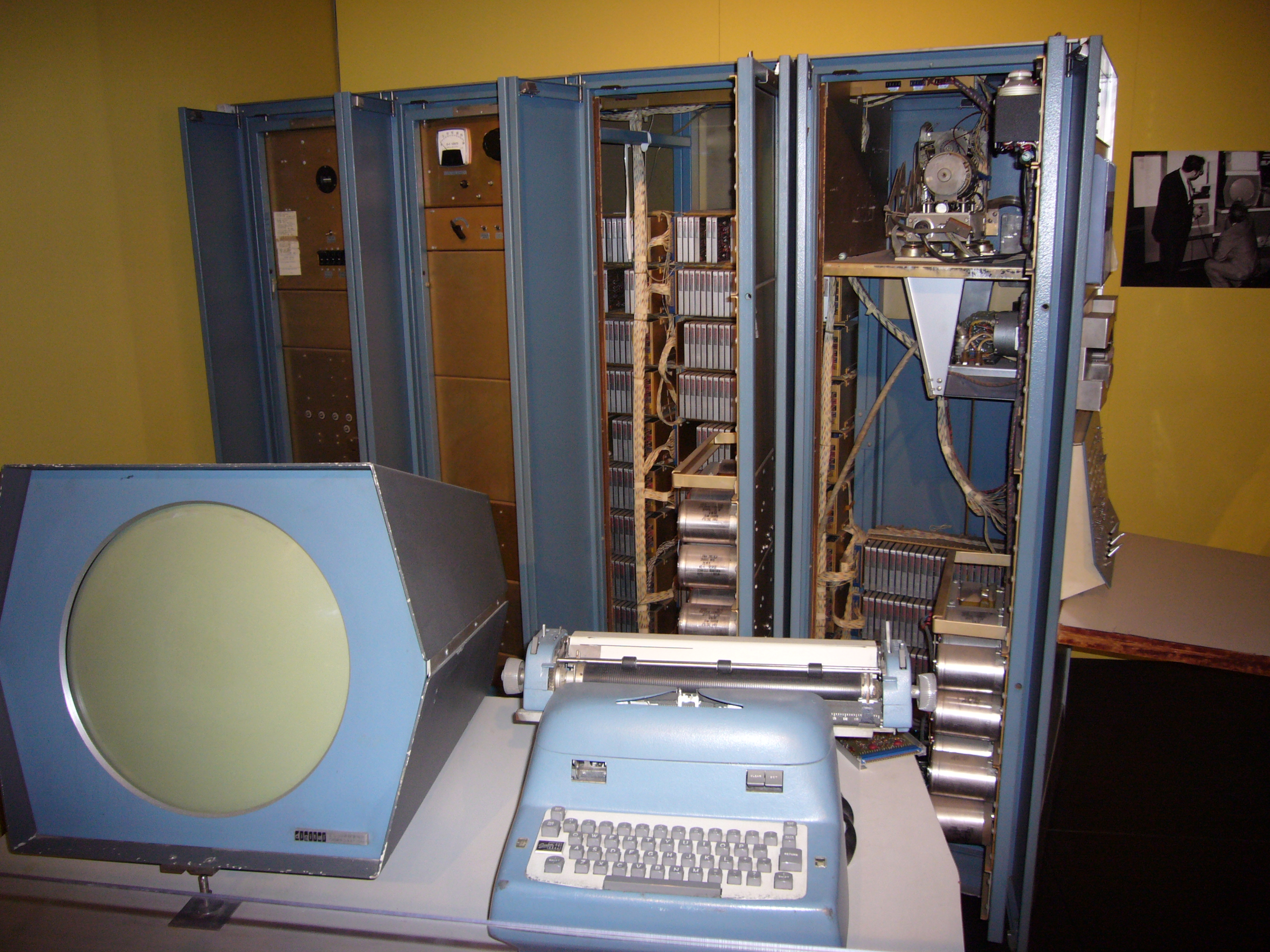
PDP-1

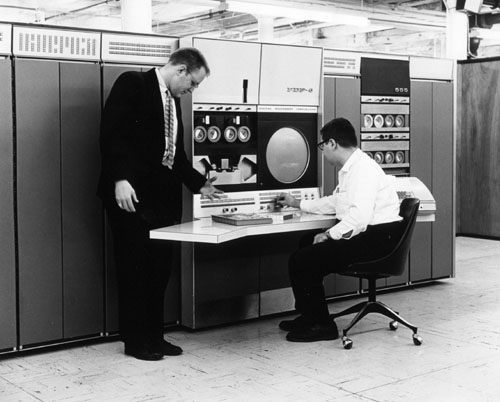
PDP-6

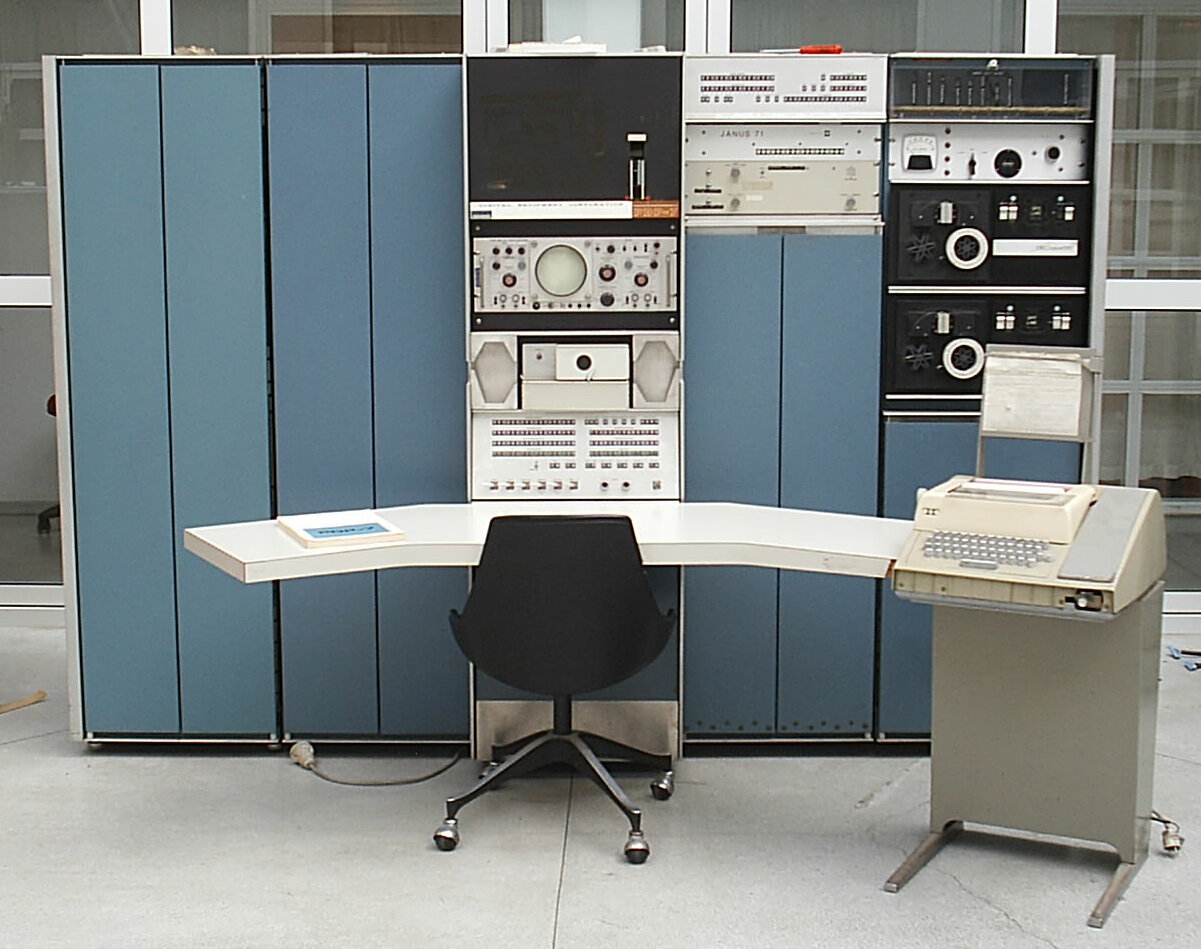
PDP-7

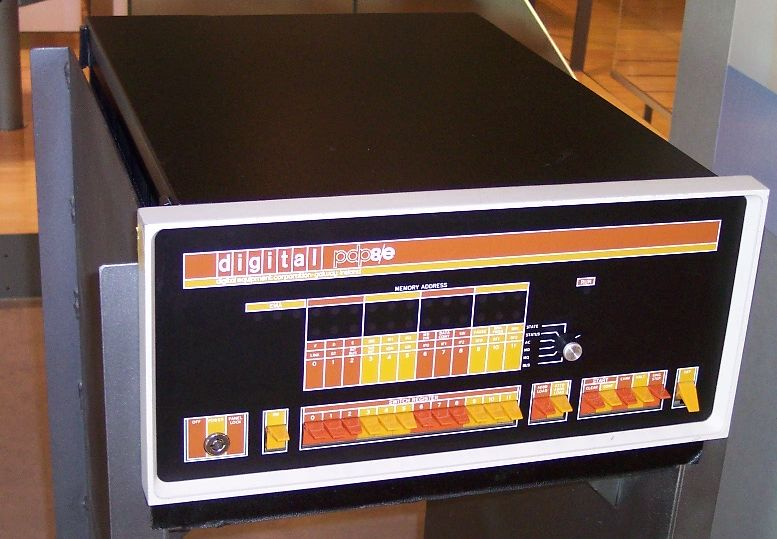
PDP-8/e

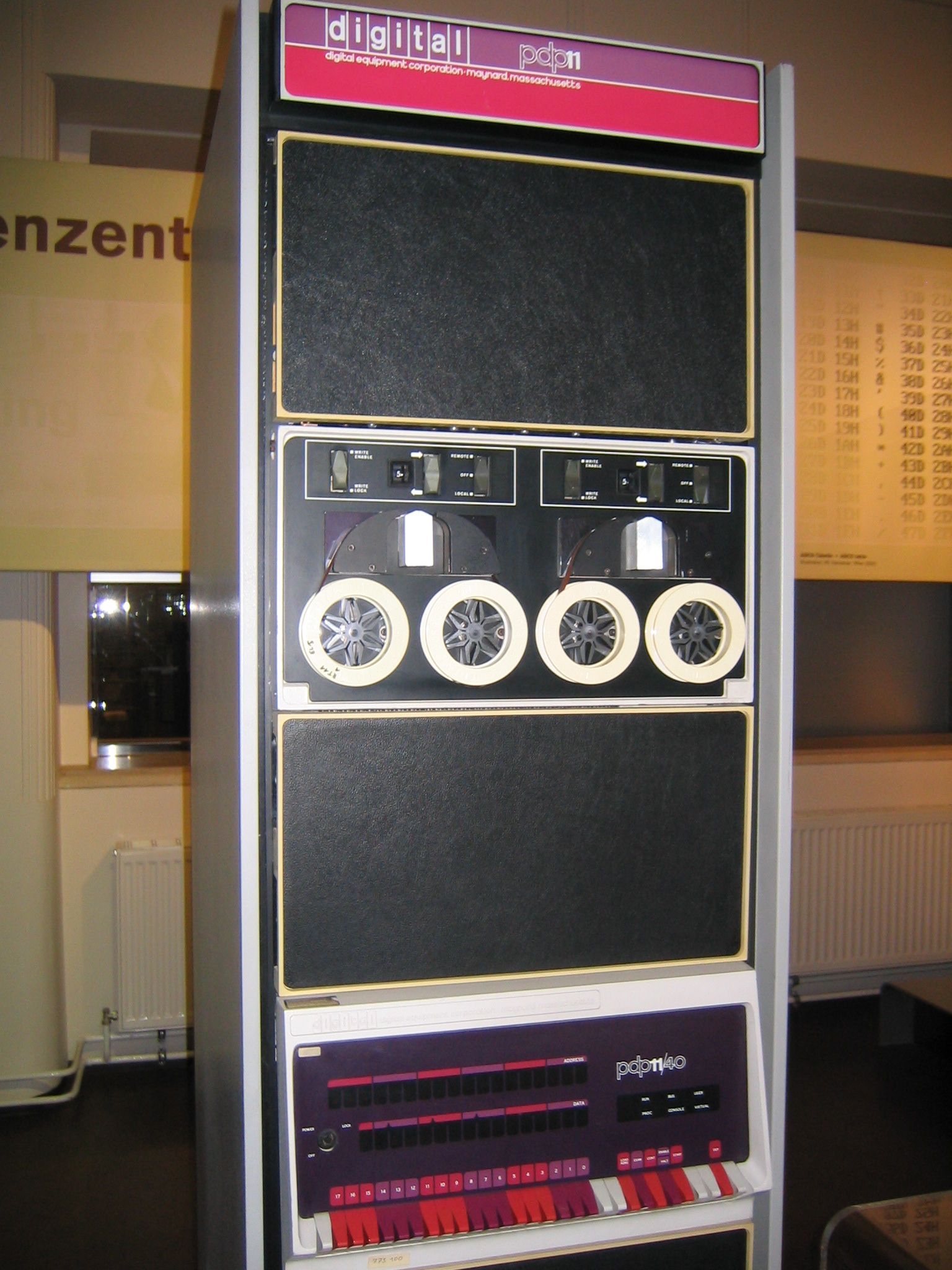
PDP-11/40

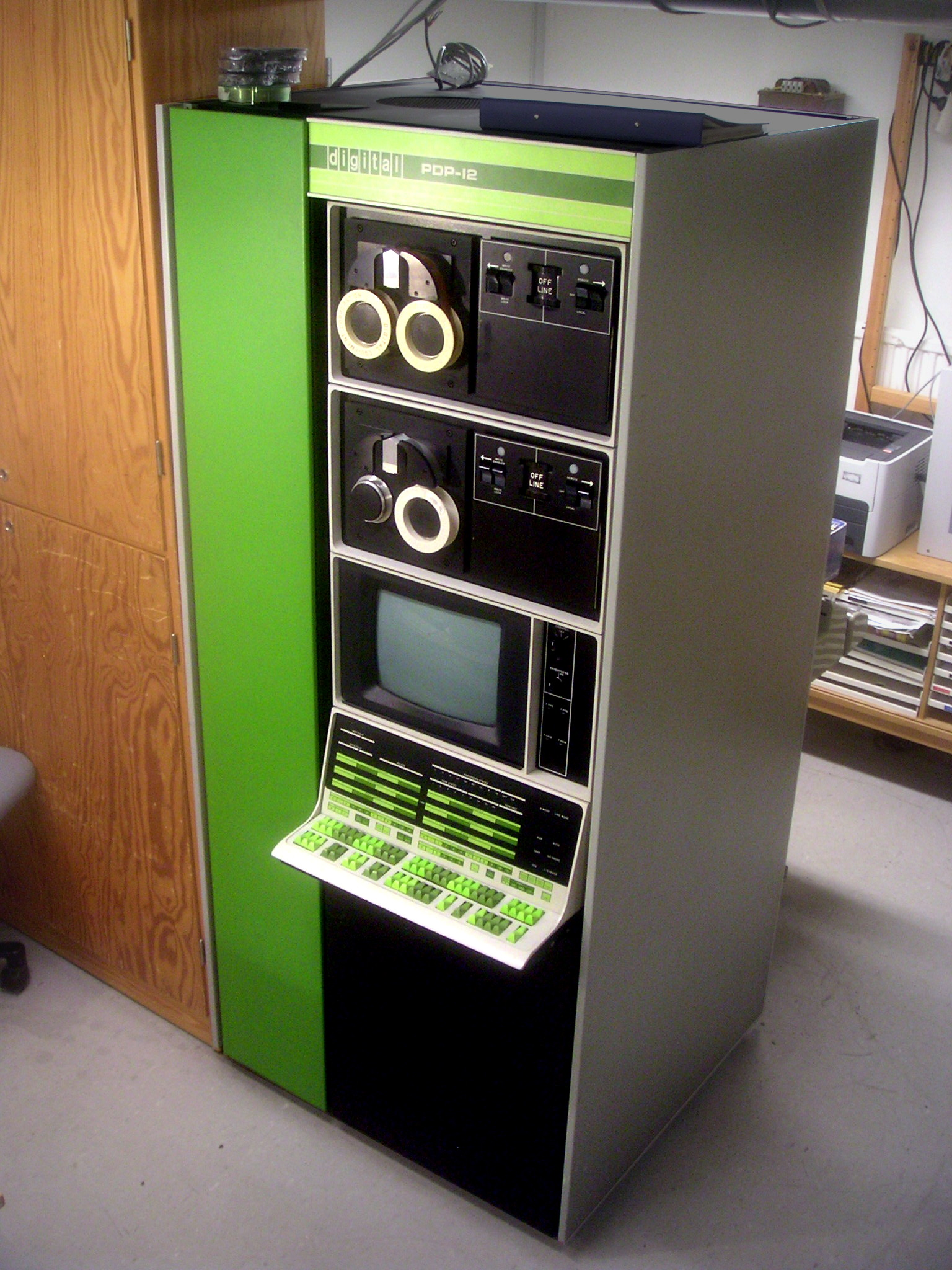
PDP-12

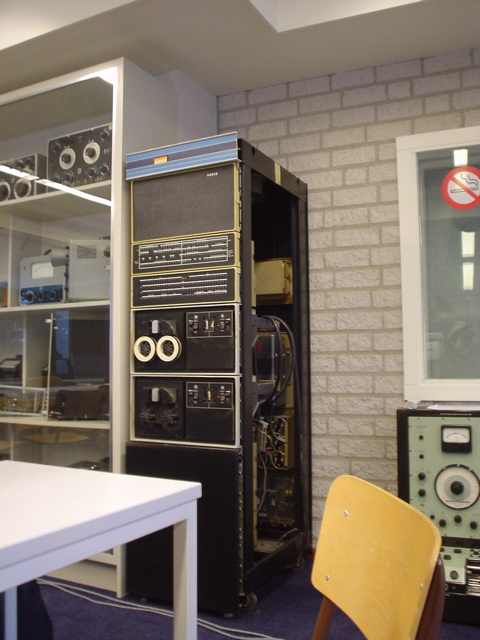
PDP-15 (partial)

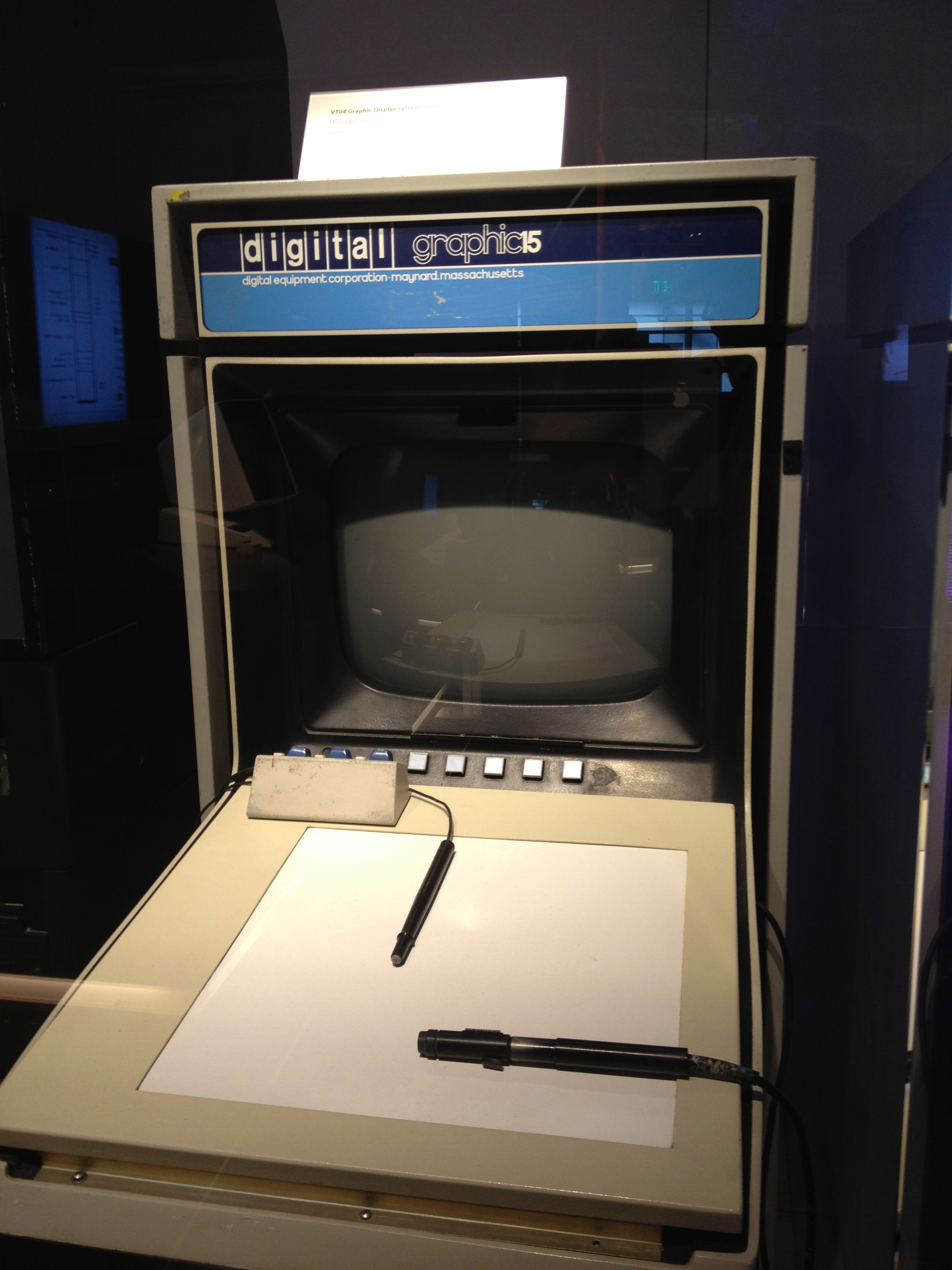
PDP-15 graphics terminal with light pen and digitizing tablet

Programmed Data Processor (PDP), referred to by some customers, media and authors as "Programmable Data Processor," is a term used by the Digital Equipment Corporation from 1957 to 1990 for several lines of minicomputers.

The name "PDP" intentionally avoids the use of the term "computer". At the time of the first PDPs, computers had a reputation of being large, complicated, and expensive machines. The venture capitalists behind Digital (especially Georges Doriot) would not support Digital's attempting to build a "computer" and the term "minicomputer" had not yet been coined. So instead, Digital used their existing line of logic modules to build a Programmed Data Processor and aimed it at a market that could not afford the larger computers.

== Families ==
The various PDP machines can generally be grouped into families based on word length and backward compatibility. Families of PDP machines include:

- 18-bit: PDP-1
- 18-bit: PDP-4 → PDP-7 → PDP-9 → PDP-15
- 12-bit: PDP-5 → PDP-8 → PDP-12
- 36-bit: PDP-6 → PDP-10 → DECsystem-10 → DECsystem-20
- 16-bit: PDP-11 [→ 32-bit: VAX]

PDP-1
The original PDP, an 18-bit four-rack machine used in early time-sharing operating system work, and prominent in MIT's early hacker culture, which led to the (Massachusetts) Route 128 hardware startup belt (DEC's second home, Prime Computer, etc.). What is believed to be the first video game, Spacewar!, was developed for this machine, along with the first known word processing program for a general-purpose computer, "Expensive Typewriter". It was based to some extent on the TX-0 which Ben Gurley had also contributed to. Some of the PDP-1's component modules were drawn from the existing catalogue of commercially-available DEC System Modules, although according to Edward Fredkin about half were newly designed by Gurley.

The last of DEC's 53 PDP-1 computers was built in 1969, a decade (Note: the first was in December 1959, but often is referred to as "1960.") after the first, and nearly all of them were still in use as of 1975. "An average configuration cost $120,000" at a time "when most computer systems sold for a million dollars or more."

Its successors as 18-bit machines were the PDP-4, PDP-7, PDP-9, and the PDP-15, although those machines were not compatible with the PDP-1.

PDP-2
A number reserved for an unbuilt, undesigned 24-bit design.
PDP-3
The first 36-bit machine designed by DEC, advertised to customers but never built by Digital. Architecturally it was essentially a 36-bit extension of the PDP-1 with index registers: the PDP-3's 1960 preliminary specification describes the PDP-1 as "the 18 bit version of PDP-3" When the USAF's Air Force Cambridge Research Laboratories attempted to order a PDP-3 in the early 1960s (for speech research) DEC became reluctant to fulfil the order, fearing mainly the burden of providing software support. DEC persuaded the prospective user to instead buy two PDP-1s with a special hardware link. One computer was built to the PDP-3 design, by the CIA's Scientific Engineering Institute (SEI) in Waltham, Massachusetts, out of standard DEC modules purchased from Digital. It was used to process radar cross section data for the Lockheed A-12 reconnaissance aircraft. Over time this computer diverged from the PDP-3 design, and was given the name CASINO (for "Computer Able to Select INternal Orders").
PDP-4
This 18-bit machine, first shipped in 1962 of which "approximately 54 were sold" was a compromise: "with slower memory and different packaging" than the PDP-1, but priced at $65,000 - considerably less than its predecessor (about half the price). It was not compatible with the PDP-1. All later 18-bit PDP machines (7, 9 and 15) are based on a similar, but enlarged instruction set, more powerful, but based on the same concepts as the 12-bit PDP-5/PDP-8 series. One customer of these early PDP machines was Atomic Energy of Canada. The installation at Chalk River, Ontario included an early PDP-4 with a display system and a new PDP-5 as interface to the research reactor instrumentation and control.
PDP-5
It was the world's first commercially produced minicomputer and DEC's first 12-bit machine (1963). The instruction set was later expanded in the PDP-8 to handle more bit rotations and to increase the maximum memory size from 4K words to 32K words. It was one of the first computer series with more than 1,000 built.
PDP-6
This 36-bit machine, DEC's first large PDP computer, came in 1964 with the first DEC-supported timesharing system. 23 were installed. Although the PDP-6 was "disappointing to management," it introduced the instruction set and was the prototype for the far more successful PDP-10 and DEC System-20,
PDP-7
Replacement for the PDP-4; DEC's first wire-wrapped machine using the associated Flip-Chip module form-factor. It was introduced in 1964, and a second version, the 7A, was subsequently added. A total of 120 PDP-7 and PDP-7A systems were sold.

The first version of Unix, and the first version of B, a predecessor of C, were written for the PDP-7 at Bell Labs, as was the first version (by DEC) of MUMPS.
PDP-8
12-bit machine (1965) with a tiny instruction set; DEC's first major commercial success and the start of the minicomputer revolution. Many were purchased (at discount prices, a DEC tradition, which also included free manuals for anyone who asked during the Ken Olsen years) by schools, university departments, and research laboratories.

Over 50,000 units among various models of the family (A, E, F, I, S, L, M) were sold. Later models are also used in the DECmate word processor and the VT-78 workstation.
LINC-8
The system contained both a PDP-8 CPU and a LINC CPU; two instruction sets; 1966. Progenitor of the PDP-12.
PDP-9
Successor to the PDP-7; DEC's first micro-programmed machine (1966). It features a speed increase of approximately twice that of the PDP-7. The PDP-9 is also one of the first small or medium scale computers to have a keyboard monitor system based on DIGITAL's own small magnetic tape units (DECtape). The PDP-9 established minicomputers as the leading edge of the computer industry.
PDP-10
Also marketed as the DECsystem-10, (Note: whose CPU manual was named DECsystem-10/DECSYSTEM-20 Processor Reference Manual "DECsystem-10/DECSYSTEM-20 Processor Reference Manual" (PDF). DEC. Archived from the original (PDF) on 11 October 2015.) (Note: sometimes called a DEC-10) this 36-bit timesharing machine (1966) was quite successful over several different implementations (KA, KI, KL, KS) and models. (Note: 1055, 1090, 2020, 2040, 2065 and others) The instruction set is a slightly elaborated form of that of the PDP-6.

The KL was also used for the DECSYSTEM-20. The KS was used for the 2020, DEC's entry in the distributed processing market, introduced as "the world's lowest cost mainframe computer system."
PDP-11
The archetypal minicomputer (1970); a 16-bit machine and another commercial success for DEC. The LSI-11 is a four-chip PDP-11 used primarily for embedded systems. The 32-bit VAX series is descended from the PDP-11, and early VAX models have a PDP-11 compatibility mode. The 16-bit PDP-11 instruction set has been very influential, with processors ranging from the Motorola 68000 to the Renesas H8 and Texas Instruments MSP430, inspired by its highly orthogonal, general-register oriented instruction set and rich addressing modes. The PDP-11 family was extremely long-lived, spanning 20 years and many different implementations and technologies.
PDP-12
12-bit machine (1969), descendant of the LINC-8 and thus of the PDP-8. It had one CPU that could change modes and execute the instruction set of either system. See LINC and PDP-12 User Manual. With slight redesign, and different livery, officially followed by, and marketed as, the "Lab-8".

PDP-13
Designation was not used.
PDP-14
A machine with 12-bit instructions, intended as an industrial controller (PLC; 1969). It has no data memory or data registers; instructions can test Boolean input signals, set or clear Boolean output signals, jump conditional or unconditionally, or call a subroutine. Later versions (for example, the PDP-14/30) are based on PDP-8 physical packaging technology. I/O is line voltage.
PDP-15
DEC's final 18-bit machine (1970). It is the only 18-bit machine constructed from TTL integrated circuits rather than discrete transistors, and, like every DEC 18-bit system (except mandatory on the PDP-1, absent on the PDP-4) has an optional integrated vector graphics terminal, DEC's first improvement on its early-designed 34n where n equalled the PDP's number. Later versions of the PDP-15 run a real-time multi-user OS called "XVM". The final model, the PDP-15/76 uses a small PDP-11 to allow Unichannel peripherals to be used.
PDP-16
A "roll-your-own" digital system using Register Transfer Modules, mainly intended for industrial control systems with more capability than the PDP-14. They could be used to design a custom controller consisting of a control structure and associated data storage and manipulation modules, or to design a small computer which could then be programmed. The PDP-16 modules were based on the RTMs designed by Gordon Bell during his time at Carnegie Mellon University. The PDP-16/M was introduced in 1972 as a pre-assembled set of the PDP-16 modules that could be programmed and was nicknamed a "Subminicomputer".

== Related computers ==
- TX-0 designed by MIT's Lincoln Laboratory, important as influence for DEC products including Ben Gurley's design for the PDP-1. When the memory was replaced with a smaller one, the instruction set was expanded, and it was moved to the MIT campus. When a PDP-1 arrived on campus, it was placed in the next room. Software such as an assembler was ported from the TX-0 to the PDP-1 and the machines were connected for communications between them.
- LINC (Laboratory Instrument Computer), originally designed by MIT's Lincoln Laboratory, some built by DEC. Not in the PDP family, but important as progenitor of the PDP-12. The LINC and the PDP-8 can be considered the first minicomputers, and perhaps the first personal computers as well. The PDP-8 and PDP-11 are the most popular of the PDP series of machines. Digital never made a PDP-20, although the term was sometimes used for a PDP-10 running TOPS-20 (officially known as a DECSYSTEM-20).
- Several unlicensed clones of the PDP-11.
- TOAD-1 and TOAD-2, Foonly, and Systems Concepts PDP-10/DECSYSTEM-20-compatible machines.
