= Motorola MC14500 =

1-bit industrial control microprocessor

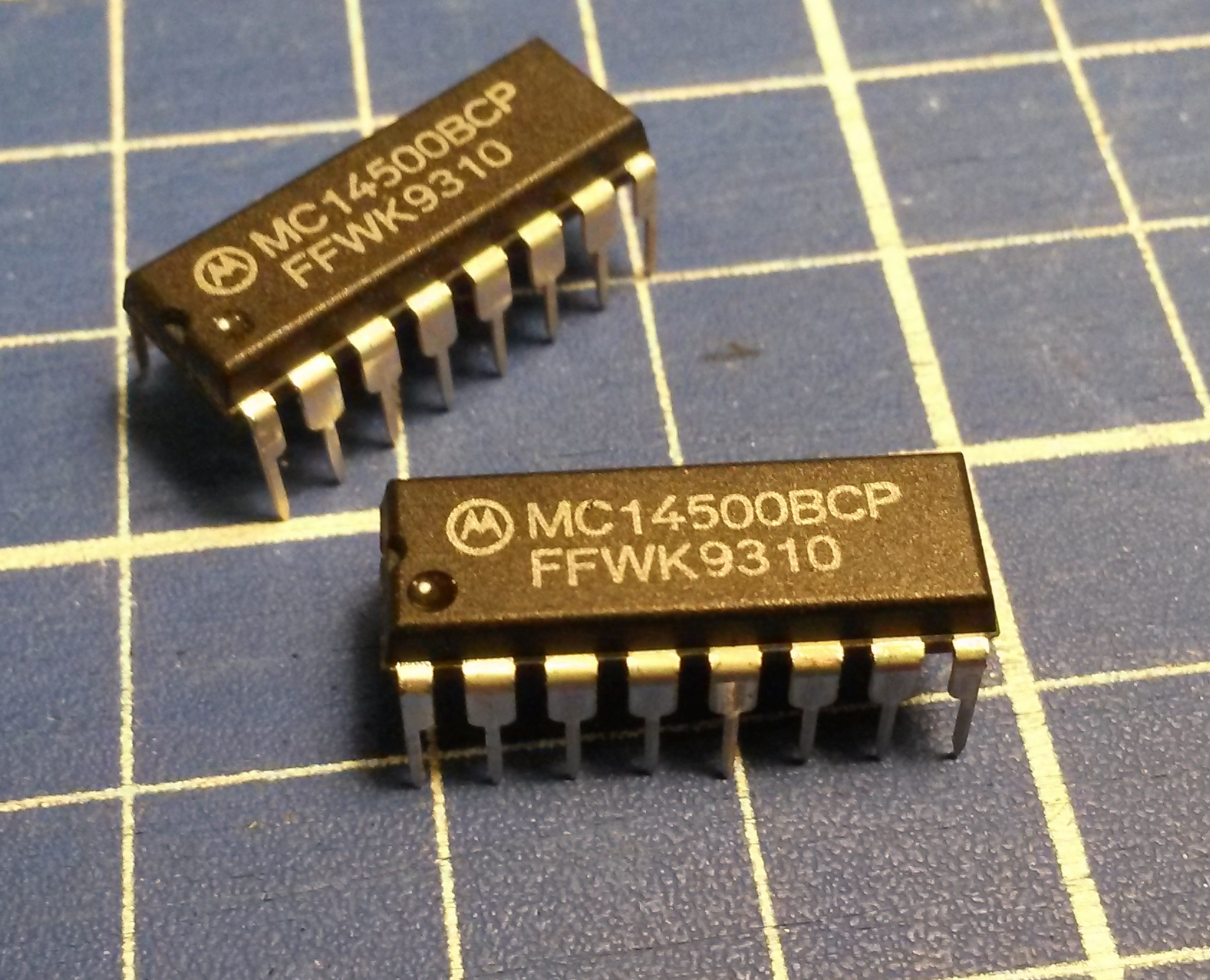
1-bit microprocessor MC14500BCP

The MC14500 Industrial Control Unit (ICU) is a CMOS one-bit microprocessor designed by Motorola for simple control applications in 1977. It was packaged in a 16-pin DIP and normally ran at 1 MHz with 5 V and only 5 μA. If higher performance was needed, it could run as fast as 4 MHz by increasing the voltage to 15 V. It was inexpensive for the era, available at launch for $7.58 in 100-unit lots.

== Overview ==
MC14500B (ICU) is well-suited to the implementation of ladder logic, and thus could be used to replace relay systems and programmable logic controllers, also intended for serial data manipulation. The processor supports 16 commands, operating at a frequency of 1 MHz. The MC14500B unit does not include a program counter (PC); instead, a clock signal drives a separate PC chip; therefore the size of supported memory is dependent on the implementation of that chip. It was still in production in 1995.

The ICU architecture is similar to that of the DEC PDP-14 computer.

The MC14500B was implemented with a transistor count of roughly 500 transistors. The chip was so simple not only because it only handled 1-bit computing data at a time, but also because the chip did not include a program counter, subroutine stack, etc. -- those required external chips.

== Developers ==
The ICU was conceived by Vern Gregory in the mid-1970s while working as an engineer in a marketing / applications group of Motorola Semiconductor Products Sector in Phoenix, Arizona, USA; Brian Dellande originated circuit and subroutine designs, and co-wrote the manual; Ray DiSilvestro was the bench technician; Terry Malarkey provided management support.

In the CMOS Logic Division in Austin, Texas, USA (where it was made) Phil Smith was the chip designer; Mike Hadley provided product applications support.

== Derivatives ==
A form of the design served as an embedded controller in a custom automotive chip made for Nippon Denso by Motorola—Japan.

I.P.R.S. Băneasa manufactured a clone of the MC14500B with the designation βP14500 in IIL technology (rather than the original CMOS).

== Notable uses ==
One of the computers known to be based on this processor is the educational WDR 1-bit computer (512 bits of RAM, LED, I/O, keyboard).

A modern take, in retro style, of a computer based on this processor is the PLC14500-Nano. It is certified as Open Source Hardware PL000011 so anyone can learn from its design and can freely build it.

== See also ==
- WDR paper computer
- WDR Computerclub
- NDR computer
