= Computer club =

Computer club or Computer Club may refer to:

- Computer club (user group), a computer users' group
- Computer Club (broadcast), a former German TV broadcast about computers
- Computer Club (band), a music band by Ashley Jones
