= PDP-16 =

Industrial computer from Digital

The PDP-16 (Programmed Data Processor-16) was mainly intended for industrial control systems, but with more capability than DEC's PDP-14.

== Overview ==
The PDP-16 family of modules was introduced in 1971, and a pre-assembled system using these modules, the PDP-16/M was introduced in 1972. The 16/M was nicknamed "Subminicomputer" and described as "a small microprogrammable computer."

The general-purpose modules included:

1. components to build a data path (registers, memories, ALUs, etc.)
2. components to build a control structure (evoke an operation in the datapath, branch on a condition from the datapath, merge, etc.)
3. other components necessary to complete a digital system (lights, switches, bus termination, backplane, etc.)

The control structure was similar to a flow chart, which was very familiar to software developers. As a result, the PDP-16 opened up digital system design to those with experience writing software but less hardware design experience than was traditionally required for this work.

These modules were in the company's M series of Flip-Chip modules, which used TTL circuit technology.

The economic strength of the PDP-16 was that it was effective "for designing unique (or relatively low production volume) systems."
