= ND812 =

1970 minicomputer

- Developer: Nuclear Data, Inc.
- Type: Minicomputer
- Released: 1970
- Introductory price: $8,400, equivalent to about $70,000 in 2025

The 12-bit ND812, produced by Nuclear Data, Inc., was a commercial minicomputer developed for the scientific computing market. Nuclear Data introduced it in 1970 at a price of $8,400 for a basic system with 4K words and teletype (equivalent to about $70,000 in 2025).

== Description ==
- ND812 registers
_{0}	_{1}	_{2}	_{3}	_{4}	_{5}	_{6}	_{7}	_{8}	_{9}	^{1}_{0}	^{1}_{1}	(bit position)
Main accumulators
J												J accumulator
K												K accumulator
Sub-accumulators
R												R accumulator
S												S accumulator
Program counter
PC												Program Counter
Status flags
F	O											Flag/Overflow

The architecture has a simple programmed I/O bus, plus a DMA channel. The programmed I/O bus typically runs low to medium-speed peripherals, such as printers, teletypes, paper tape punches and readers, while DMA is used for cathode ray tube screens with a light pen, analog-to-digital converters, digital-to-analog converters, tape drives, disk drives.

The word size, 12 bits, is large enough to handle unsigned integers from 0 to 4095 – wide enough for controlling simple machinery. This is also enough to handle signed numbers from -2048 to +2047. This is higher precision than a slide rule or most analog computers. Twelve bits could also store two six-bit characters (note, six-bit isn't enough for two cases, unlike "fuller" ASCII character set). "ND Code" was one such 6-bit character encoding that included upper-case alphabetic, digit, a subset of punctuation and a few control characters. The ND812's basic configuration has a main memory of 4,096 twelve-bit words with a 2 microsecond cycle time. Memory is expandable to 16K words in 4K word increments. Bits within the word are numbered from most significant bit (bit 11) to least significant bit (bit 0).

The programming model consists of four accumulator registers: two main accumulators, J and K, and two sub accumulators, R and S. A rich set of arithmetic and logical operations are provided for the main accumulators and instructions are provided to exchange data between the main and sub accumulators. Conditional execution is provided through "skip" instructions. A condition is tested and the subsequent instruction is either executed or skipped depending on the result of the test. The subsequent instruction is usually a jump instruction when more than one instruction is needed for the case where the test fails.

== Input/Output ==
The I/O facilities include programmable interrupts with 4-levels of priority that can trap to any location in the first 4K words of memory. I/O can transmit 12 or 24 bits, receive 12 or 24 bits, or transmit and receive 12 bits in a cycle. I/O instructions include 4 bits for creating pulses for peripheral control. I/O peripherals can be attached via 76 signal connector that allows for direct memory access by peripherals. DMA is accomplished by "cycle stealing" from the CPU to store words directly into the core memory system.

Nuclear Data provided interfaces to the following peripherals:

- Bulk storage devices
  - Diablo Model 31 standard density disk cartridge
  - Diablo Model 31 high density disk cartridge
  - EDP fixed-head disk models 3008, 3016, 3032, 3064, or 3120
- Magnetic tape I/O devices
  - Magnetic cassette tape
  - PEC 7-track magnetic tape
  - PEC 9-track magnetic tape
- Paper tape I/O devices
  - Superior Electric Model TRP125-5 photoelectric tape reader (125 char/sec)
  - Dataterm Model HS300 photoelectric tape reader (300 char/sec)
  - Remex Model RPF1150B photoelectric tape reader (200 char/sec)
  - Remex Model RPF1075B mylar tape punch (75 char/sec)
  - Tally Model 1504 paper tape reader (60 char/sec)
  - Tally Model 1505 paper tape punch (60 char/sec)
  - Teletype Model BRPE11 paper tape punch (110 char/sec)
- Hard copy I/O devices
  - Data Products Model 2410 line printer
  - Centronics Model 101 line printer (165 char/sec)
  - Franklin Model 1220 printer (20 lines/sec)
  - Franklin Model 1230 printer (30 lines/sec)
  - Hewlett-Packard Model 5050A printer (20 lines/sec)
  - Hewlett-Packard Model 5055A printer (10 lines/sec)
  - Calcomp digital incremental plotter

== Programming facilities ==
The ND812 did not have an operating system, just a front panel and run and halt switches. The I/O facility allowed for peripherals to directly load programs into memory while the computer was halted and not executing instructions. Another option was to enter a short loader program that would be used to bootstrap the desired program from a peripheral such as a teletype or paper tape reader. Since core memory is non-volatile, shutting off the computer did not result in data or program loss.

A number of system programs were made available by Nuclear Data for use with the ND812: BASC-12 assembler, symbolic text editor, NUTRAN interpreter, and disk-based symbolic text editor,

=== BASC-12 Assembler ===
An assembler called BASC-12 was provided. BASC-12 was a two-pass assembler, with an optional third pass. Pass one generates a symbol table, pass two produces a binary output tape and pass three provides a listing of the program.

A sample of the assembler from the Principles of Programming the ND812 Computer manual is shown below:

/Input two unequal numbers "A" and "B", compare the two numbers
/and determine which is larger, and output a literal statement
/"A > B", or "B > A" as applicable.
/
/Input and store values for A & B
                *200
Start,          TIF                     /Clear TTY flag
                JPS     Input           /Get value for A
                STJ     A
                JPS     Input           /Get value for B
                STJ     B
/
/Determine which of the two values is larger
                LDJ     A
                SBJ     B               /Subtract B from A
                SIP     J               /Test for A positive
                JMP     BRAN            /No! B > A
                LDJ     ABCST           /Yes! A > B
                SKIP                    /Skip next instruction
BRAN,           LDJ     BACST
/
/Set up and output expression
/
                JPS     OUT
                STOP
                JMP     START
/
/Working or data storage area
/
A,              0                       /Constant A
B,              0                       /Constant B
ABCST,          AB                      /Address of A > B literal
BACST,          BA                      /Address of B > A literal
C260,           260                     /ASCII zone constant
/
/Input routine + ASCII zone strip
/
Input,          0                       /Entry point
                TIS
                JMP     .-1
                TRF
                TCP                     /Echo input at teletype
                TOS
                JMP     .-1
                SBJ     C260
                JMP@    INPUT
/
/Output routine - Output ASCII expression
/
Out,            0                       /Entry point
                STJ     LOOP+1
                LDJ     C5              /Set number of character constant
                STJ     CTR
/
/Output data loop
/
Loop,           TWLDJ
                0
                TCP
                TOS
                JMP     .-1
                ISZ     LOOP+1
                DSZ     CTR             /Test for all characters out
                JMP     LOOP            /No
                JMP@    Out             /Return
C5,             5
CTR,            0
/
/Output messages
/
AB,             215
                212
                301     /A
                276     />
                302     /B
BA,             215
                212
                302     /B
                276     />
                301     /A
$                                       /End character

=== NUTRAN ===
NUTRAN, a conversational, FORTRAN-like language, was provided. NUTRAN was intended for general scientific programming. A sample of NUTRAN is shown below:

1 PRINT 'INPUT VALUES FOR X AND Y'
2 INPUT X,Y
3 Z=X+Y
4 PRINT 'X+Y= ',Z
5 STOP

An example of the conversational nature of NUTRAN is shown below. > is the command prompt and : is the input prompt.

>1.G
INPUT VALUES FOR X AND Y
:3
:2
X+Y=    .5000000E  1

>

== Instruction formats ==
The instruction set consists of single and double word instructions. Operands can be immediate, direct or indirect. Immediate operands are encoded directly in the instruction as a literal value. Direct operands are encoded as the address of the operand. Indirect operands encode the address of the word containing a pointer to the operand. Nuclear Data documentation denotes bit zero as the most significant bit in the word and bit 11 as the least significant bit in the word.

=== Single word instructions ===
0	3	4	5	6	11
Operation		D/I	+/-	Displacement

The displacement and sign bit allow single word instructions to address locations between -63 and +63 of the location of the instruction. Bit 4 of the instruction allows for a choice between indirect and direct addressing. When the displacement is used as an indirect address, the contents of the location which is +/-63 locations from the instruction location is used as a pointer to the actual operand.

Many single word instructions do not reference memory and use bits 4 and 5 as part of the specification of the operation.

==== Literal format ====
0	3	4	5	6	11
Operation		Instruction		Literal

==== Group 1 Format ====
0	3	4	5	6	7	8	11
0010		K	J	Shift Rotate		Shift Count

Group 1 instructions perform arithmetic, logical, exchange and shifting functions on the accumulator registers. This includes hardware multiply and divide instructions. Bit 4 is set if the K register is affected. Bit 5 is set if the J register is affected. Both bits are set if both registers are affected.

==== Group 2 format ====
0	3	4	5	6	7	8	9	10	11
0011		K	J	OV	Comp Set	Comp Clear	0; 1	>=0 < 0	!=0 ==0

Group 2 format instructions test for internal conditions of the J and K accumulator registers, manipulate the overflow and flag status bits and provide complement, increment and negation operations on the J and K accumulator registers. Bits 9, 10 and 11 select the condition to be tested.

=== Two word instructions ===
0	2	3	6	7	8	9	10	11
000		Instruction		Ind	KJ Acc.	Change Fields	MF1	MF2
Absolute 12-bit Address

Bit 9, Change Fields, inhibits the absolute address from referencing a different field than the one containing the instruction. When bit 8 is 1, the upper accumulator K is used with the instruction, otherwise the lower accumulator J is used. When bit 7 is 1, indirect addressing is used, otherwise direct addressing is used.

=== Status Word format ===
0	1	2	3	4	5	6	7	8	9	10	11
Flag	Overflow	JPS		Int		IONL	IONA	IONB	IONH	Current Execution
		MF0	MF1	MF1	MF2					MF1	MF2

The status register doest not exist as a distinct register. It is the contents of several groups of indicators that are all stored in the J register when desired. The JPS and Int bits hold the current field contents that would be used during a JPS instruction or interrupt. The flag and overflow bits can be set explicitly from the J register contents with the RFOV instruction, but the other bits must be set by distinct instructions.

=== Subroutines ===
The ND812 processor provides a simple stack for operands, but doesn't use this mechanism for storing subroutine return addresses. Instead, the return address is stored in the target of the JPS instruction and then the PC register is updated to point to the location following the stored return address. To return from the subroutine, an indirect jump through the initial location of the subroutine restores the program counter to the instruction following the JPS instruction.

== Instruction set ==
=== Memory reference instructions ===
Assembler Mnemonic	Octal Code	Description	Registers Affected
ANDF	2000	AND with J, Forward	J
LDJ	5000	Load J	J
TWLDJ	0500	Load J	J
STJ	5400	Store J	Memory
TWSTJ	0540	Store J	Memory
TWLDK	0510	Load K	K
TWSTK	0550	Store K	Memory
ADJ	4400	Add to J	J, OV
TWADJ	0440	Add to J	J, OV
SBJ	4000	Subtract from J	J, OV
TWSBJ	0400	Subtract from J	J, OV
TWADK	0450	Add to K	K, OV
TWSBK	0410	Subtract from K	K, OV
ISZ	3400	Increment memory and skip if zero	Memory, PC
TWISZ	0340	Increment memory and skip if zero	Memory, PC
DSZ	3000	Decrement memory and skip if zero	Memory, PC
TWDSZ	0300	Decrement memory and skip if zero	Memory, PC
SMJ	2400	Skip if memory not equal to J	PC
TWSMJ	0240	Skip if memory not equal to J	PC
TWSMK	0250	Skip if memory not equal to K	PC
JMP	6000	Unconditional jump	PC
TWJMP	0600	Unconditional jump	PC
JPS	6400	Jump to subroutine	Memory, PC
TWJPS	0640	Jump to subroutine	Memory, PC
XCT	7000	Execute instruction	

=== Logical operations ===
Assembler Mnemonic	Octal Code	Description	Registers Affected
AND J	1100	Logical AND J,K into J	J
AND K	1200	Logical AND J,K into K	K
AND JK	1300	Logical AND J,K into J,K	J, K

=== Arithmetic operations on accumulators ===
Assembler Mnemonic	Octal Code	Description	Registers Affected
AJK J	1120	(J + K) to J	J, OV
NAJK J	1130	-(J + K) to J	J, OV
SJK J	1121	(J - K) to J	J, OV
NSJK J	1131	-(J - K) to J	J, OV
ADR J	1122	(R + J) to J	J, OV
NADR J	1132	-(R + J) to J	J, OV
ADS J	1124	(S + J) to J	J, OV
NADS J	1134	-(S + J) to J	J, OV
SBR J	1123	(R - J) to J	J, OV
NSBR J	1133	-(R - J) to J	J, OV
SBS J	1125	(S - J) to J	J, OV
NSBS J	1135	-(S - J) to J	J, OV
AJK K	1220	(J + K) to K	K, OV
NAJK K	1230	-(J + K) to K	K, OV
SJK K	1221	(J - K) to K	K, OV
NSJK K	1231	-(J - K) to K	K, OV
ADR K	1222	(R + K) to K	K, OV
NADR K	1232	-(R + K) to K	K, OV
ADS K	1224	(S + K) to K	K, OV
NADS K	1234	-(S + K) to K	K, OV
SBR K	1223	(R - K) to K	K, OV
NSBR K	1233	-(R - K) to K	K, OV
SBS K	1225	(S - K) to K	K, OV
NSBS K	1235	-(S - K) to K	K, OV
AJK JK	1320	(J + K) to J,K	J, K, OV
NAJK JK	1330	(J + K) to J,K	J, K, OV
SJK JK	1321	(J - K) to J,K	J, K, OV
NSJK JK	1331	-(J - K) to J,K	J, K, OV
MPY	1000	Multiply J by K into R, S	J, K, R, S, OV
DIV	1001	Divide J,K by R into J, K	J, K, R, S, OV

=== Shift/rotate instructions ===
Assembler Mnemonic	Octal Code	Description	Registers Affected
SFTZ J	1140	Shift J left N	J
SFTZ K	1240	Shift K left N	K
SFTZ JK	1340	Shift J,K left N	J, K
ROTD J	1160	Rotate J left N	J
ROTD K	1260	Rotate K left N	K
ROTD JK	1360	Rotate J,K left N	J,K

=== Load and exchange operations ===
Assembler Mnemonic	Octal Code	Description	Registers Affected
LJSW	1010	Load J from switch register	J
LRF J	1101	Load R from J	R
LJFR	1102	Load J from R	J
EXJR	1103	Exchange J and R	J, R
LSFK	1201	Load S from K	S
LKFS	1202	Load K from S	K
EXKS	1203	Exchange K and S	K, S
LKFJ	1204	Load K from J	K
EXJK	1374	Exchange J and K	J, K
LRSFJK	1301	Load R, S from J, K	R, S
LJKFRS	1302	Load J, K from R, S	J, K
EXJRKS	1303	Exchange J, K and R, S	J, K, R, S
LJST	1011	Load status register into J	J
RFOV	1002	Read Flag, OV from J	J

=== Conditional skips ===
Assembler Mnemonic	Octal Code	Description	Registers Affected
SIZ J	1505	Skip if J equals zero	PC
SIZ K	1605	Skip if K equals zero	PC
SIZ JK	1705	Skip if both J and K equals zero	PC
SNZ J	1501	Skip if J not equal zero	PC
SNZ K	1601	Skip if K not equal zero	PC
SNZ JK	1701	Skip if J or K not equal zero	PC
SIP J	1501	Skip if J positive	PC
SIP K	1602	Skip if K positive	PC
SIP JK	1702	Skip if both J and K positive	PC
SIN J	1506	Skip if J negative	PC
SIN K	1606	Skip if J negative	PC
SIN JK	1706	Skip if both J and K negative	PC

=== Clear, complement, increment and set ===
Assembler Mnemonic	Octal Code	Description	Registers Affected
CLR J	1510	Clear J	J
CLR K	1610	Clear K	K
CLR JK	1710	Clear J, K	J, K
CMP J	1520	Complement J	J
CMP K	1620	Complement K	K
CMP JK	1720	Complement J, K	J, K
SET J	1530	Set J to -1	J
SET K	1630	Set K to -1	K
SET JK	1730	Set J, K to -1	J, K

=== Overflow bit instructions ===
Assembler Mnemonic	Octal Code	Description	Registers Affected
SIZ O	1445	Skip if overflow zero	PC
SNZ O	1441	Skip if overflow set	PC
CLR O	1450	Clear overflow	OV
CMP O	1460	Complement overflow	OV
SET O	1470	Set overflow	OV

=== Flag bit instructions ===
Assembler Mnemonic	Octal Code	Description	Registers Affected
SIZ	1405	Skip if flag zero	PC
SNZ	1401	Skip if flag set	PC
CLR	1410	Clear flag	F
CMP	1420	Complement flag	F
SET	1430	Set flag	F

=== Increment and negate ===
Assembler Mnemonic	Octal Code	Description	Registers Affected
INC J	1504	Increment J	J
INC K	1604	Increment K	K
INC JK	1704	Increment J, K	J, K
NEG J	1524	Negate J	J
NEG K	1624	Negate K	K
NEG JK	1724	Negate J, K	J, K

=== Interrupt instructions ===
Assembler Mnemonic	Octal Code	Description	Registers Affected
IONH	1004	Enable interrupt level H	
IONA	1006	Enable interrupt level A, H	
IONB	1005	Enable interrupt level B, H	
IONN	1007	Enable all interrupt levels	
IOFF	1003	Disable all interrupts	

=== Powerfail logic instructions ===
Assembler Mnemonic	Octal Code	Description	Registers Affected
PION	1500	Powerfail on	
PIOF	1600	Powerfail off	
SKPL	1440	Skip on power low	PC

=== Literal instructions ===
Assembler Mnemonic	Octal Code	Description	Registers Affected
ANDL	2100	AND literal with J	J
ADDL	2200	Add literal to J	J
SUBL	2300	Subtract literal from J	J

=== INT and JPS register instructions ===
Assembler Mnemonic	Octal Code	Description	Registers Affected
LDREG	7720	Load JPS from J, INT from K	
LDJK	7721	Load JPS to J, INT to K	J, K
RJIB	7722	Set JPS and INT status	

=== Teletype system ===
Assembler Mnemonic	Octal Code	Description	Registers Affected
TIS	7404	Skip if keyboard ready	PC
TIR	7402	Load keyboard into J	J
TIF	7401	Keyboard-reader fetch	
TRF	7403	Keyboard read-fetch	J
TOS	7414	Skip if printer-punch ready	PC
TOC	7411	Clear flag	
TCP	7413	Clear flag, print-punch	
TOP	7412	Print-punch	

=== High-Speed paper tape ===
Assembler Mnemonic	Octal Code	Description	Registers Affected
HIS	7424	Skip HS reader ready	PC
HIR	7422	Clear flag; read HS buffer	J
HIF	7421	HS reader fetch	
HRF	7423	HS reader read-fetch	J
HOS	7434	Skip if HS punch ready	PC
HOL	7432	Clear flag; load buffer from J	
HOP	7431	Punch on HS punch	
HLP	7433	Load and punch HS punch	

=== Magnetic cassette tape system ===
Assembler Mnemonic	Octal Code	Description	Registers Affected
CSLCT1	7601	Place cassette 1 on-line	
CSLCT2	7602	Place cassette 2 on-line	
CSLCT3	7604	Place cassette 3 on-line	
CSTR	0740, 0124	Selected TWIO skip if transport ready	PC
CSFM	0740, 0104	Skip on filemark	PC
CSET	0740, 0110	Skip if transport at end of tape	PC
CSNE	0740, 0122	Skip if no error	PC
CSBT	0740, 0130	Skip if transport at beginning of tape	PC
CCLF	0740, 0141	Clear all cassette control flags	
CWFM	0740, 0151	Write file mark	
CSWR	0740, 0152	Skip if write ready	PC
CWRT	0740, 0154	Write J into buffer	
CSRR	0740, 0142	Skip if ready	PC
CRDT	0740, 0144	Read buffer into J	J
CHSF	0740, 0101	High speed forward to EOT	
CSPF	0740, 0102	Space forward to filemark	
CHSR	0740, 0121	High-speed reverse to BOT	

=== Miscellaneous instructions ===
Assembler Mnemonic	Octal Code	Description	Registers Affected
STOP	0000	Stop execution	
SKIP	1442	Unconditional skip	PC
IDLE	1400	One cycle delay	
TWIO	0740	Two-word I/O	
