= Nuclear Data, Inc. =

Nuclear Data Incorporated
- Defunct: 1973
- Fate: Acquired by Bunker Ramo
- Successor: Bunker Ramo (1973-1989); Metropolitan Circuits, Inc. (1989-present)
- Headquarters: Schaumburg, Illinois, United States
- Products: ND812 minicomputer

Nuclear Data Incorporated was a manufacturer of scientific measuring devices for high energy physics laboratories. Application areas included X-ray analysis and radiation monitoring. In the 1960s, they built minicomputers to automate their laboratory devices, such as the ND 812. Over time, they replaced these custom designed computers with DEC LSI-11 minicomputers with custom peripherals. Their headquarters were located in Schaumburg, Illinois.

In May, 1973, Bunker Ramo acquired the Electronic Store Information Systems Division of Nuclear Data for $3.2 million in cash. The sale included a point of sale terminal business.

On July 5, 1989, the company formally changed its name to Metropolitan Circuits, Inc., after having divested most of their business to other companies.
