= WDR Computerclub =

German television broadcast on computer technology

WDR Computerclub was the first television broadcast in West Germany of the Westdeutscher Rundfunk (WDR) that dealt solely with the issues of computer and technology. It began its first broadcasting in 1981 under the name eff-eff, was later renamed to WDR Computerclub, and was hosted until 2003 by Wolfgang Back and Wolfgang Rudolph.

The program had its focus on entertainment and information and the viewing public could also participate. During the show, curious and selfmade projects were presented. In the early days the show focused more on home computers, later the IBM PC and other personal computer moved closer to the center. Reference books were presented regurlary.

The show received generally positive reviews. After 22 years and 400 shows, it was cancelled being the oldest and most well-known show for computer and technology in German television. Various online petitions to preserve the show were started by a number of viewers. The last show was broadcast on 22 February 2003 on WDR.

== See also ==
- German television
- Computer Chronicles
- ComputerTreff
- WDR paper computer
- WDR 1-bit computer
