= PDP-15 =

18-bit computer by Digital, 1970–79

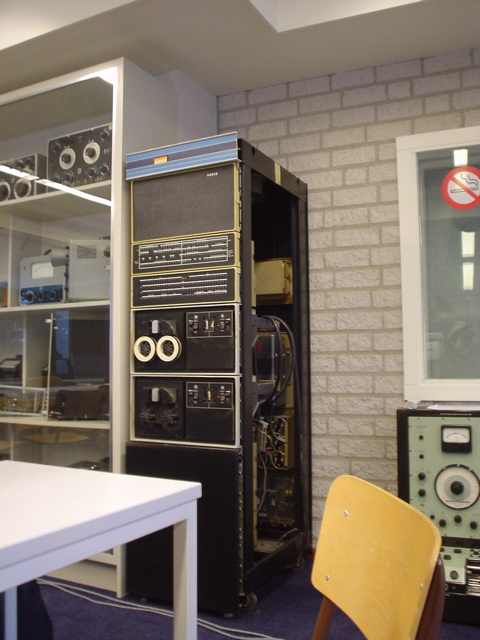
- An incomplete PDP-15
- Developer: Digital Equipment Corporation
- Product family: Programmed Data Processor
- Type: Minicomputer
- Released: February 1970; 56 years ago
- Lifespan: 9 years
- Introductory price: 15,600
- Discontinued: 1979
- Units sold: 790
- Operating system: DECsys, RSX-15, XVM/RSX, MUMPS, DOS-15
- Platform: PDP 18-bit
- Predecessor: PDP-9

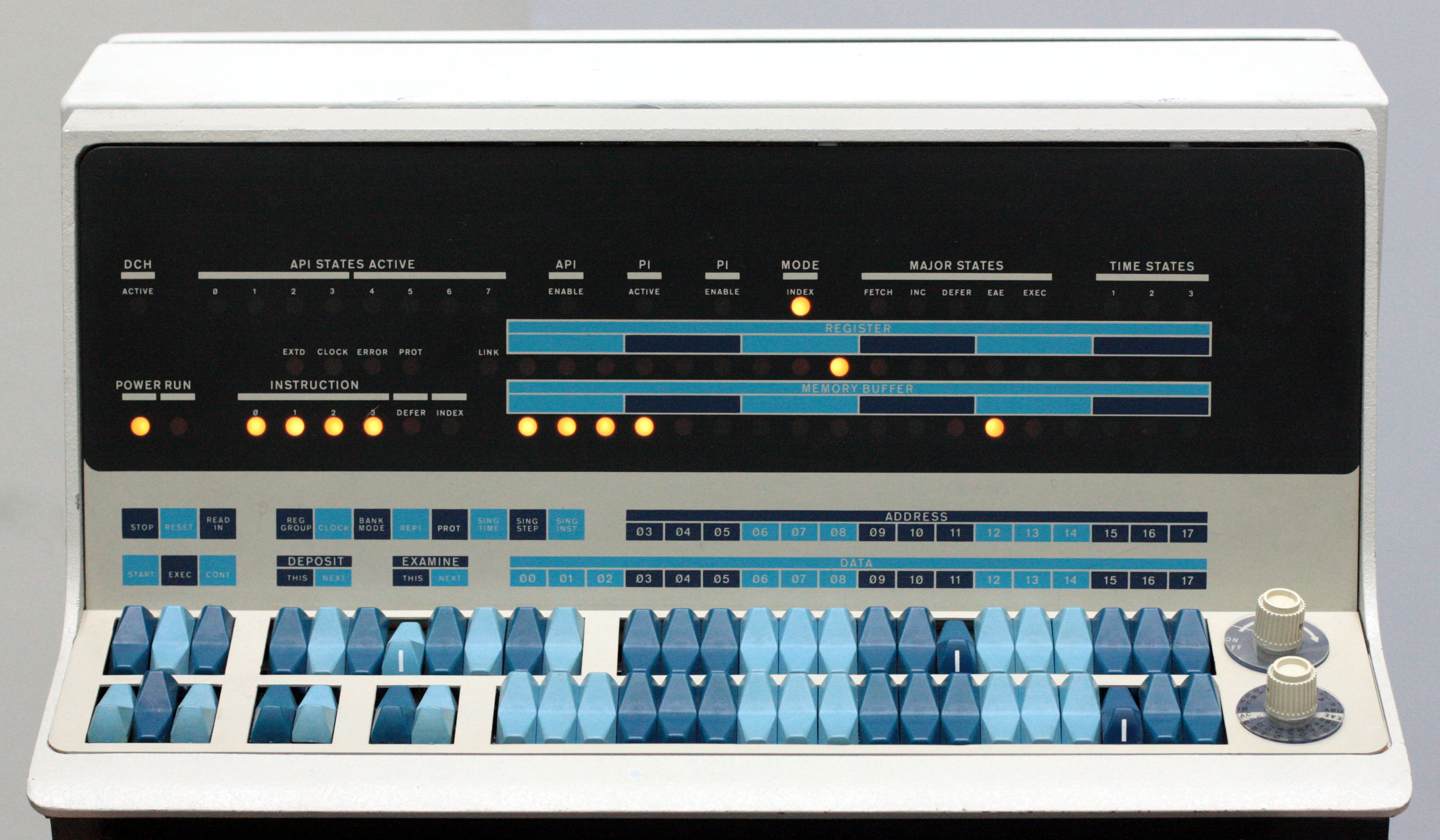
PDP-15 console

The PDP-15 was an 18-bit minicomputer by Digital Equipment Corporation that first shipped in February 1970. It was the fifth and last of DEC's 18-bit machines, a series that had started in December 1959 with the PDP-1. More than 400 were ordered within the first eight months. A later model, the PDP-15/76, was bundled with a complete PDP-11, allowing the PDP-15 to use peripherals for the PDP-11's popular Unibus system. The last PDP-15 was produced in 1979, with total sales of about 790 units.

The PDP-15 was essentially a version of the earlier PDP-9 that was constructed using small-scale integration integrated circuits, which made it smaller and less expensive than the PDP-9's flip chips which used individual transistors. A basic 8 kW PDP-9 cost about $35,000 in 1968 (equivalent to $316,000 in 2024), whereas the PDP-15 with 4 kW was only $15,600 (equivalent to $126,000 in 2024) and a fully-equipped system with 8 kW, punch tape, KSR-35 terminal, math coprocessor and dual DECtape was $36,000 (equivalent to $291,000 in 2024), making a complete system significantly less expensive than the earlier machine.

In addition to operating systems, the PDP-15 has compilers for Fortran and ALGOL.

== History ==
The 18-bit PDP systems preceding the PDP-15 were named PDP-1, PDP-4, PDP-7 and PDP-9. The last PDP-15 was produced in 1979.

== Hardware ==
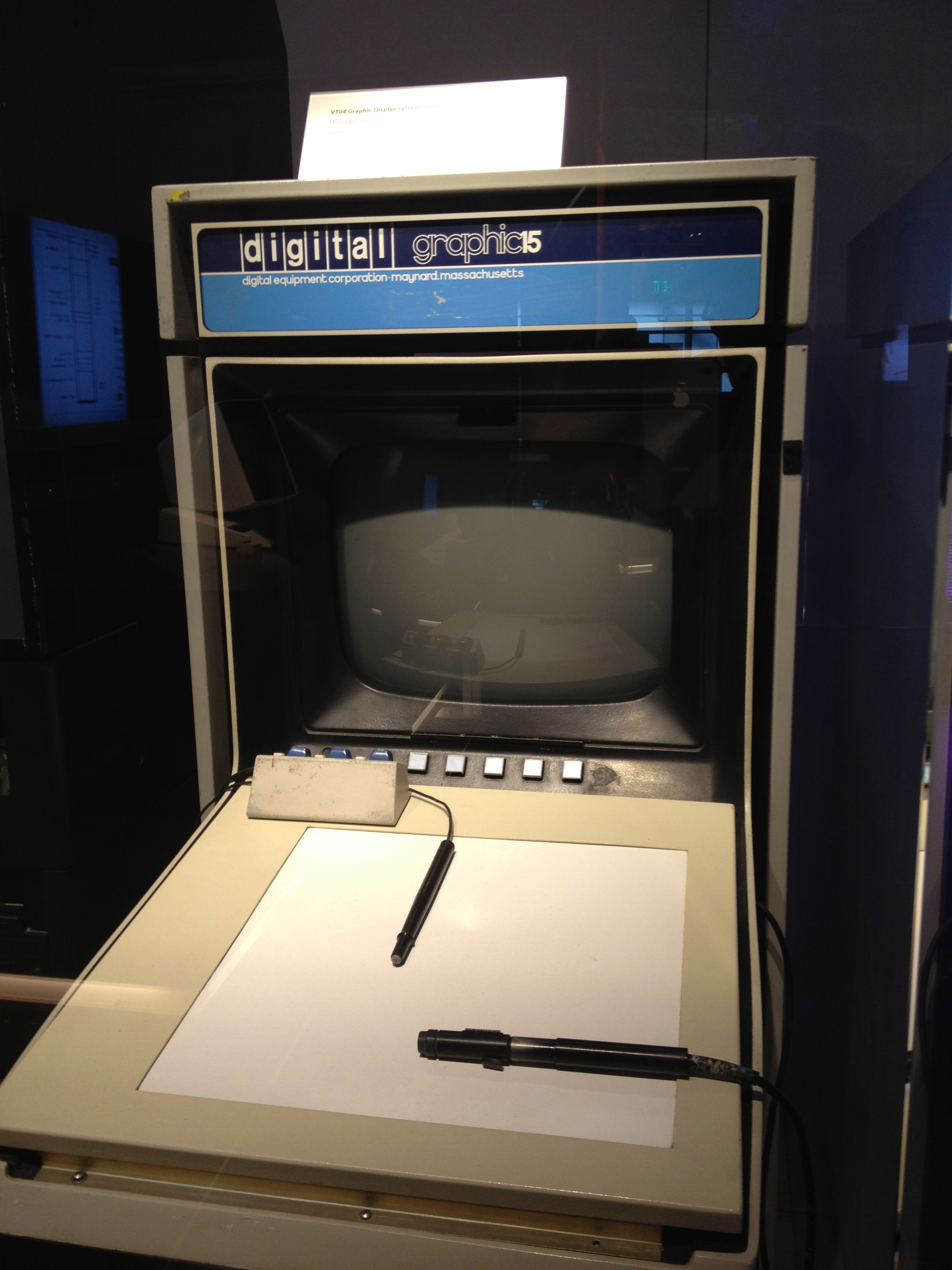
PDP-15 graphics terminal with light pen and digitizing tablet

The PDP-15 was DEC's only 18-bit machine constructed from TTL integrated circuits rather than discrete transistors, and, like every DEC 18-bit system could be equipped with:

- an optional X-Y (point-plot or vector graphics) display.
- a hardware floating-point option, with a 10x speedup.
- up to 128K words of core main memory

=== Models ===
The PDP-15 models offered by DEC were:

- PDP-15/10: a 4K-word paper-tape-based system
- PDP-15/20: 8K, added DECtape
- PDP-15/30: 16K word, added memory protection and a foreground/background monitor
- PDP-15/35: Added a 524K-word fixed-head disk drive
- PDP-15/40: 24K memory
- PDP-15/50:

==== PDP-15/76 ====
- PDP-15/76: 15/40 plus PDP-11 frontend. The PDP-15/76 was a dual-processor system that shared memory with an attached PDP-11/05. The PDP-11 served as a peripheral processor and enabled use of Unibus peripherals.

== Software ==
DECsys, RSX-15, and XVM/RSX were the operating systems supplied by DEC for the PDP-15. A batch processing monitor (BOSS-15: Batch Operating Software System) was also available.

=== DECsys ===
The first DEC-supplied mass-storage operating system available for the PDP-15 was DECsys, an interactive single-user system. This software was provided on a DECtape reel, of which copies were made for each user. This copied DECtape was then added to by the user, and thus was storage for personal programs and data. A second DECtape was used as a scratch tape by the assembler and the Fortran compiler.

=== RSX-15 ===
RSX-15 was released by DEC in 1971. The main architect for RSX-15 (later renamed XVM/RSX) was Dennis "Dan" Brevik.

Once XVM/RSX was released, DEC facilitated that "a PDP-15 can be field-upgraded to XVM" but it required "the addition of the XM15 memory processor."

The RSX-11 operating system began as a port of RSX-15 to the PDP-11, although it later diverged significantly in terms of design and functionality.

==== Origin of the RSX-15 name ====
Commenting on the RSX acronym, Brevik says:

"At first I called the new system DEX-15. It was an acronym for 'Digital's Executive - for the PDP-15.' The homonymic relation between DEC, DEX and deques (used as the primary linkage mechanism in the kernel) appealed to my sense of whimsy. People readily adopted the acronym without question.

But in a short time I was asked to submit the choice to the corporate legal department for a trademark search and registration. They sent me a memo that DEX was already trademarked by some paper company and I would have to rename the product. I pointed out to them that software and paper mills didn't seem to have a hell of a lot of connection, but they wouldn't budge.

So I sat down with pencil and paper, and in a few moments came up with better than a dozen candidate acronyms and names. My purpose was to come up with a good acronym and then find some appropriate words to justify it. For example, X always appealed to me as part of an acronym because it is pronounced so forcefully, inferring (at least to me) some power and drama. I used a lot of X's. These potential acronyms were submitted back to the legal department. At the time I had no favorite.

In a week or so they came back with a subset of my list that they could accept as trademarks. It was left to me to make the final choice.

Bob Decker and I met in my office one afternoon to discuss the choice. Bob was a marketeer who worked for me. I chalked all the candidates on the blackboard and we started going through them one by one, pronouncing each out loud, savoring the sound, trying to get the feel of each one. After ten minutes or so we had narrowed down the selection to three.

Bob sat back in silence as I kept looking at each acronym, seeing how it flowed off my tongue, what impression it gave me, and most importantly, the overall feeling about it. After three or four minutes a strong feeling came over me about one of them. It really felt right. I looked at Bob and announced, "It's RSX". I went to the board and erased all the rest until the only writing left was RSX. It even looked right.

I have absolutely no memory about the other candidate acronyms. They are lost forever, I suppose. Well, maybe there's just a chance that the legal department kept copies of the correspondence - after all they are lawyers and they seem to hold on to everything (especially my money).

Oh, by the way, the acronym stood for 'Real-Time System Executive.' Years later that was changed to 'Resource Sharing Executive,' which I think is even better.

...And that is how RSX got its name, on the 3rd floor of building 5 in the old mill."

=== XVM/RSX ===
Later versions of the PDP-15 could run a real-time multi-user OS called XVM/RSX, an outgrowth of RSX-15. The XVM upgrade to RSX was multi-user, and enabled up to six concurrent teletype-based users. XVM Support for the PDP-15/76 included using an RK05 disk drive.

=== non-DEC ===
The MUMPS operating system, which was originally developed in 1966, was developed on the PDP-7 outside DEC. It is also available for the PDP-15.

=== Application software ===
DEC provided mathematical, scientific and commercial software application tools.

== See also ==
- Programmed Data Processor
