= PDP-7 =

Minicomputer introduced in 1964

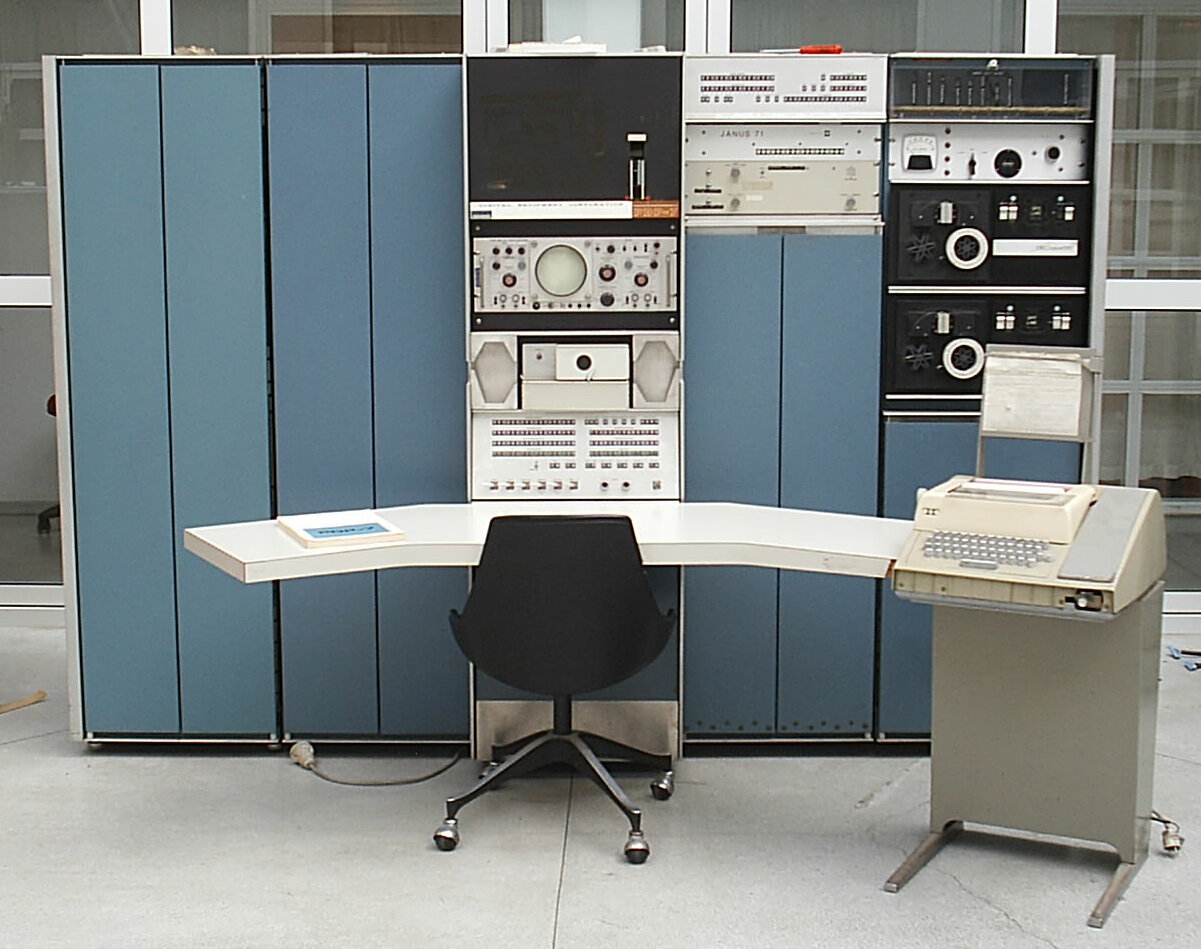
- A modified PDP-7 under restoration in Oslo, Norway
- Manufacturer: Digital Equipment Corporation
- Product family: Programmed Data Processor
- Type: Minicomputer
- Released: 1965; 61 years ago
- Introductory price: US$72,000 (equivalent to $735,586 in 2025)
- Units sold: 120
- Units shipped: 120
- Operating system: DECsys, Unix (as "Unics")
- Memory: 4K words (9.2 KB) (expandable up to 64K words (144 KB).)
- Storage: Paper-tape and dual transport DECtape drives (type 555)
- Display: Printer
- Input: Keyboard
- Platform: PDP 18-bit
- Backward compatibility: PDP-1
- Predecessor: PDP-4
- Successor: PDP-9

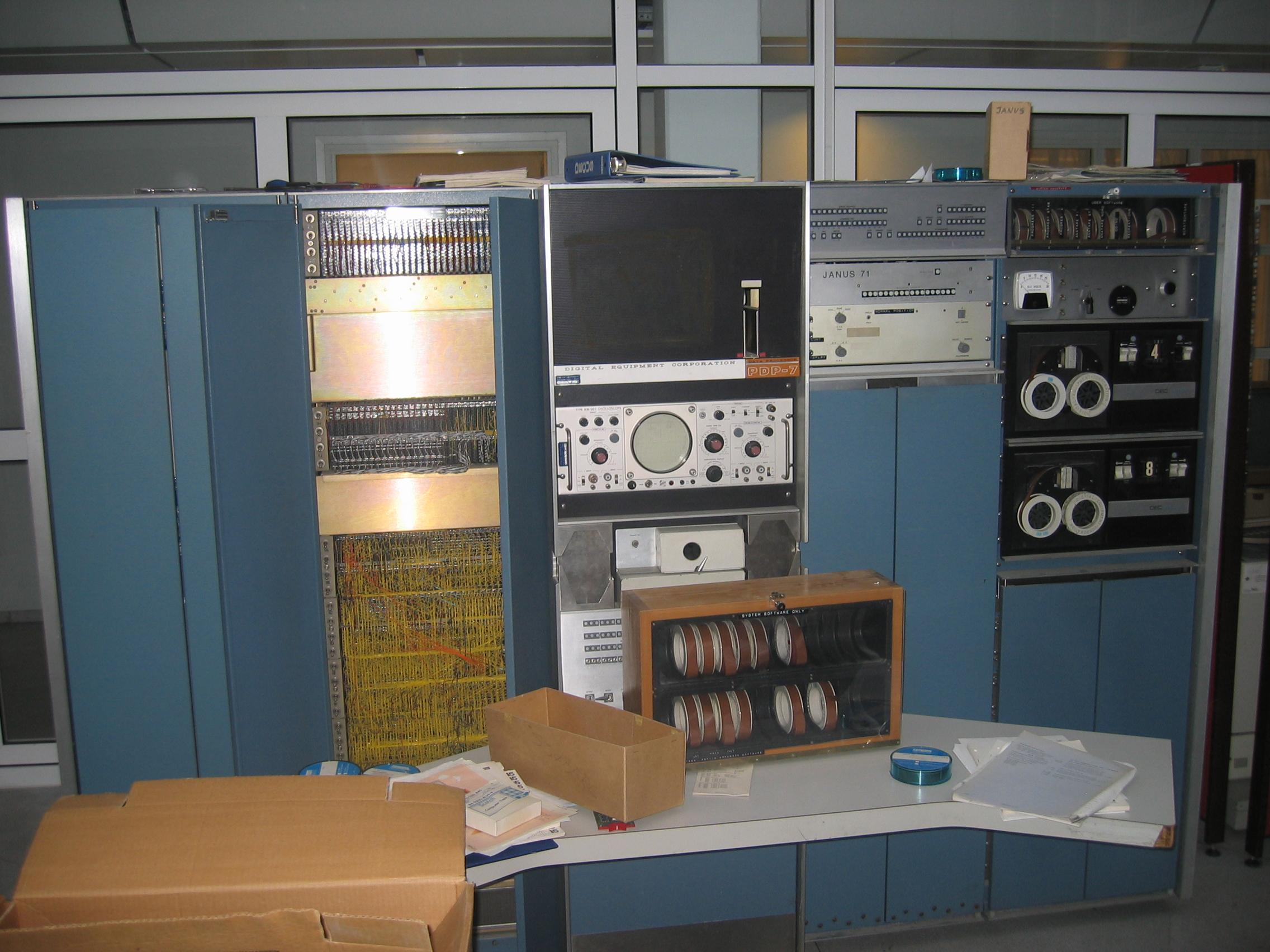
Modified PDP-7 under restoration in Oslo, Norway

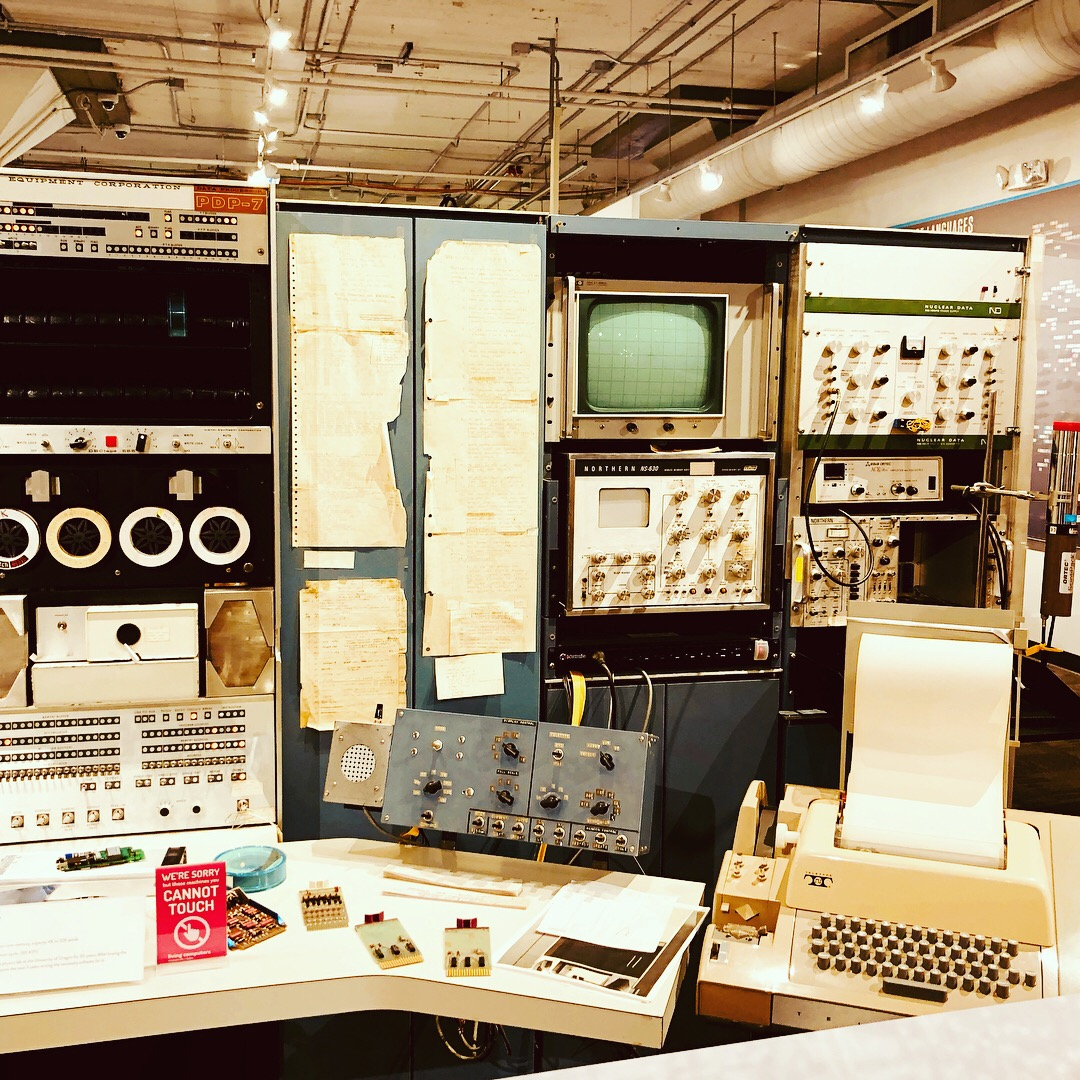
PDP-7 at Living Computer Museum

The PDP-7 is an 18-bit minicomputer produced by Digital Equipment Corporation as part of the PDP series. Introduced in 1964, shipped starting in 1965, it was the first to use their Flip-Chip technology. With a cost of US$72,000, it was cheap but powerful by the standards of the time. The PDP-7 is the third of Digital's 18-bit machines, with essentially the same instruction set architecture as the PDP-4 and the PDP-9.

== Hardware ==
The PDP-7 was the first wire-wrapped PDP computer. The computer has a memory cycle time of 1.75 µs and an add time of 4 µs. Input/output (I/O) includes a keyboard, printer, punched tape and dual transport DECtape drives (type 555). The standard core memory capacity is 4K words (9 KB) but expandable up to 64K words (144 KB).

The PDP-7 weighs about 1,100 pounds (500 kg).

== Software ==
DECsys, the first operating system for DEC's 18-bit computer family (and DEC's first operating system for a computer smaller than its 36-bit timesharing systems), was introduced in 1965. It provides an interactive, single user, program development environment for Fortran and assembly language programs.

In 1969, Ken Thompson wrote the first UNIX system, then named Unics as a pun on Multics despite only using two design elements from Multics, in assembly language on a PDP-7, as the operating system for Space Travel, a game which requires graphics to depict the motion of the planets. A PDP-7 was also the development system used during the development of MUMPS at MGH in Boston a few years earlier.

== Sales ==
The PDP-7 was described as "highly successful." A combined total of 120 of the PDP-7 and PDP-7A were sold. A DEC publication states that the first units shipped to customers in November 1964.

Eleven systems were shipped to the UK.

== Restorations ==
At least four PDP-7s were confirmed to still exist as of 2011 and a fifth was discovered in 2017.

A PDP-7A (serial number 115) was under restoration in Oslo, Norway. A second PDP-7A (serial number 113) previously located at the University of Oregon in its Nuclear Physics laboratory was at the Living Computer Museum in Seattle, Washington and is completely restored to running condition after being disassembled for transport. Another PDP-7 (serial number 47) is known to be in the collection of Max Burnet near Sydney, Australia. A fourth PDP-7 (serial number 33) is in storage at the Computer History Museum in Mountain View, California. A fifth PDP-7 (serial number 129) belonging to Fred Yerian is also located at the Computer History Museum, and has been demonstrated running Unix version 0 and compiling a B program.
