= PDP-4 =

1962 computer made by Digital Equipment Corporation

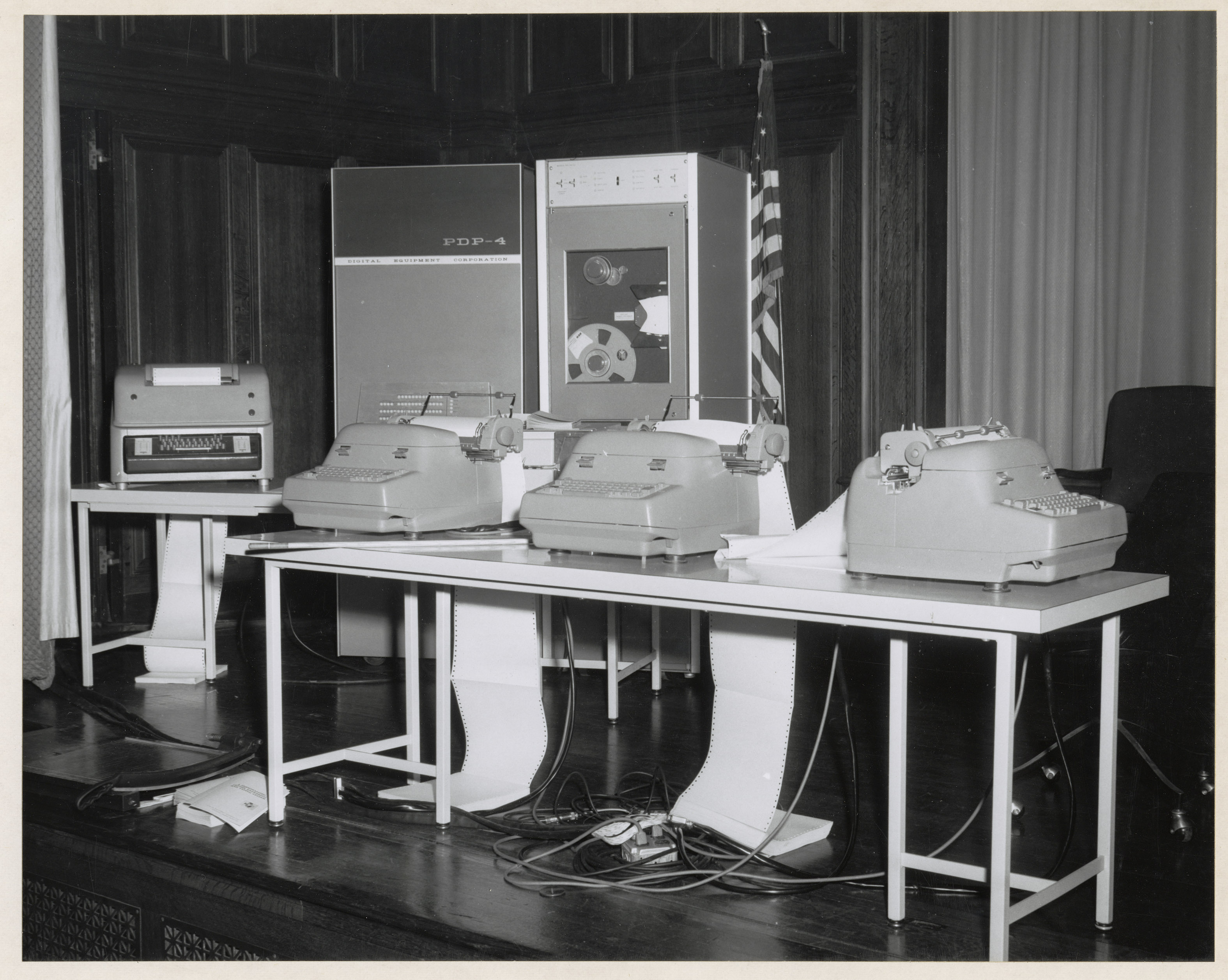
- The PDP-4 on display at NARA's auditorium stage in Washington, D.C., 1964
- Developer: Digital Equipment Corporation
- Product family: Programmed Data Processor
- Type: Minicomputer
- Released: 1962; 64 years ago
- Introductory price: US$65,000 (equivalent to $691,832 in 2025)
- Units sold: Approximately 54
- Media: Paper tape
- Platform: PDP 18-bit
- Weight: 1,090 pounds (490 kg)
- Predecessor: PDP-1
- Successor: PDP-7

The PDP-4 is an 18-bit computer system that was introducted in 1962 as a successor to the Digital Equipment Corporation's PDP-1. However, this was a completely new system, incompatible with the PDP-1. For example, the PDP-1 used ones' complement arithmetic whereas the PDP-4 used two's complement, a much faster way to implement multiple precision and floating-point operations.

== History ==
This 18-bit machine, first shipped in 1962, was a compromise: "with slower memory and different packaging" than the PDP-1, but priced at $65,000 - less than half the price of its predecessor. All later 18-bit PDP machines (7, 9 and 15) are based on a similar, but enlarged instruction set, more powerful than, but based on the same concepts as, the 12-bit PDP-5/PDP-8 series.

Approximately 54 were sold.

== Hardware ==
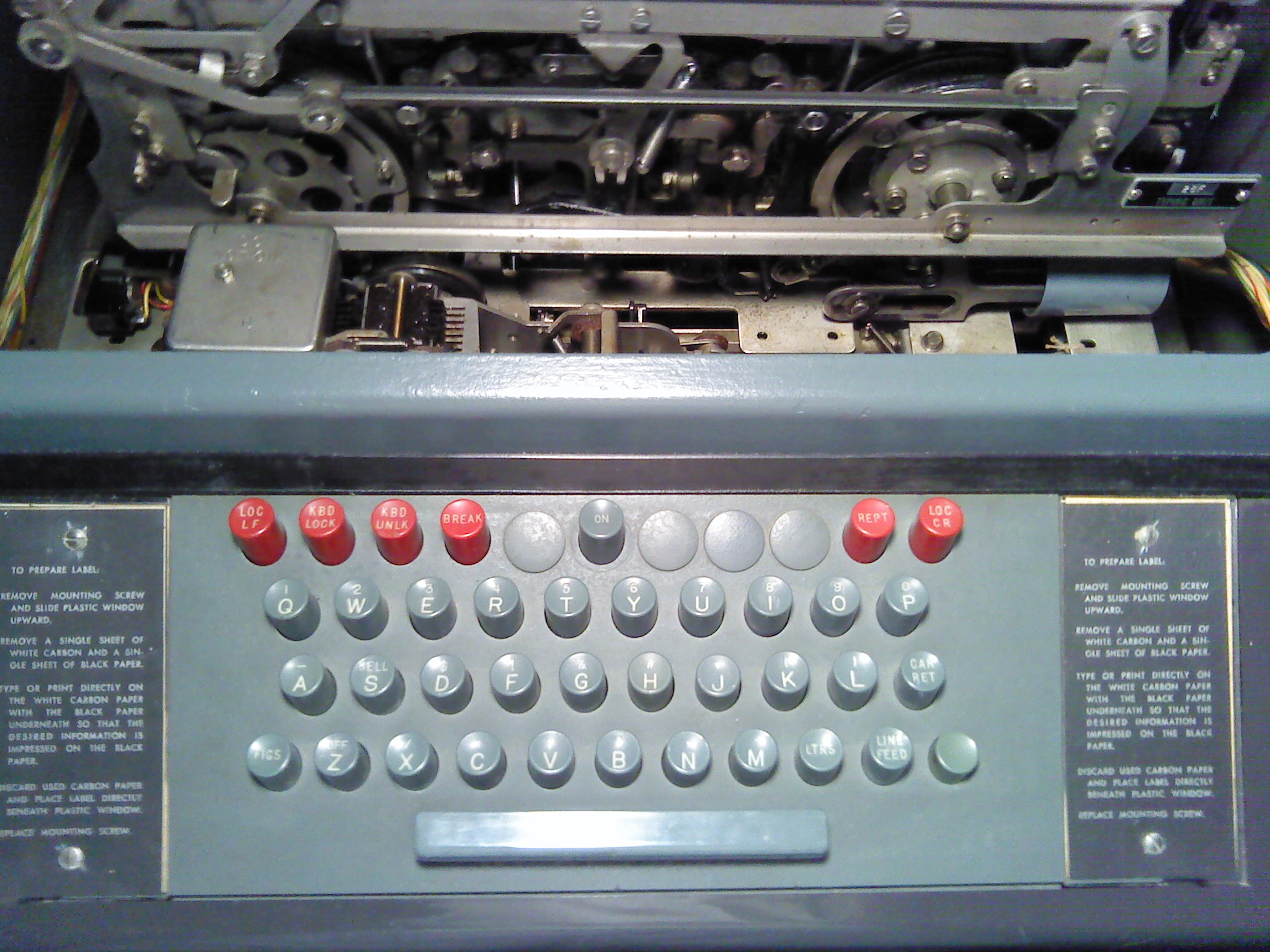
The PDP-4's console typewriter was a Teletype Model 28 ASR, with a built in paper tape reader and paper tape punch.

The PDP-4 system used magnetic core memory, with memory cycle of 8 microseconds, slower than 5 microseconds of the PDP-1. However, the access time was only 2 microseconds. The system had a memory capacity between 1024 and 32768 12-bit words (i.e. the memory capacity was from 2,304 to 73,728 bytes).

The PDP-4 weighs about 1,090 pounds (490 kg).

== Mass storage ==
Both the PDP-1 and the PDP-4 were introduced as paper tape-based systems. The only use, if any, for IBM-compatible 200 BPI or 556 BPI magnetic tape was for data. The use of "mass storage" drums - not even a megabyte and non-removable - were an available option, but were not in the spirit of the “personal” or serially shared systems that DEC offered.

It was in this setting that DEC introduced DECtape, initially called "MicroTape", for both the PDP-1 and PDP-4.

== Software ==
DEC provided an editor, an assembler, and a FORTRAN II compiler. The assembler was different from that of the PDP-1 in two ways:

- Unlike the PDP-1, macros were not supported.
- It was a one-pass assembler; paper-tape input did not have to be read twice.

== Photos ==
- PDP-4

== See also ==
- Programmed Data Processor
