= PDP-9 =

18-bit computer from Digital, 1966

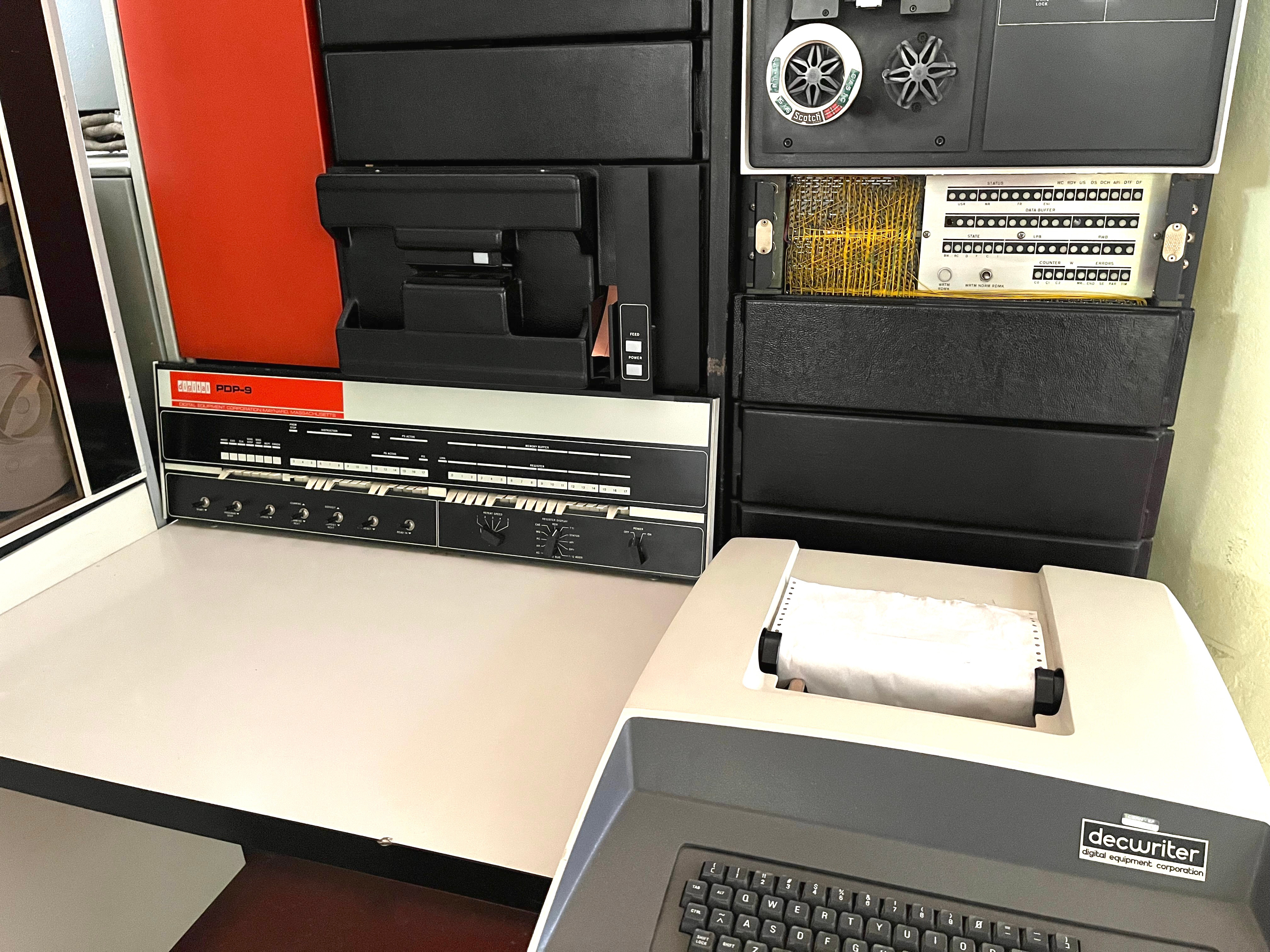
- A PDP-9 on display at ACONIT in Grenoble, France
- Developer: Digital Equipment Corporation
- Product family: Programmed Data Processor
- Type: Minicomputer
- Released: 1966; 60 years ago
- Units sold: 445
- Media: Paper tape, DECtape
- Platform: PDP 18-bit
- Weight: 750 pounds (340 kg)
- Predecessor: PDP-7
- Successor: PDP-15

The PDP-9, the fourth of the five 18-bit minicomputers produced by Digital Equipment Corporation, was introduced in 1966. A total of 445 PDP-9 systems were produced, of which 40 were the compact, low-cost PDP-9/L units.

== History ==
The 18-bit PDP systems preceding the PDP-9 are the PDP-1, PDP-4 and PDP-7. Its successor is the PDP-15.

== Hardware ==
The PDP-9, which is "two metres wide and about 75cm deep," is approximately twice the speed of the PDP-7. It was built using discrete transistors, and has an optional integrated vector graphics terminal. The PDP-9 has a memory cycle time of 1 microsecond, and weighs about 750 pounds (340 kg). The PDP-9/L has a memory cycle time of 1.5 microseconds, and weighs about 900 pounds (410 kg).

It is DEC's first microprogrammed machine.

A typical configuration included:

- 300 cps paper tape reader
- 50 cps paper tape punch
- DECtape for operating system and user files
- 10 cps console teleprinter, Model 33 KSR

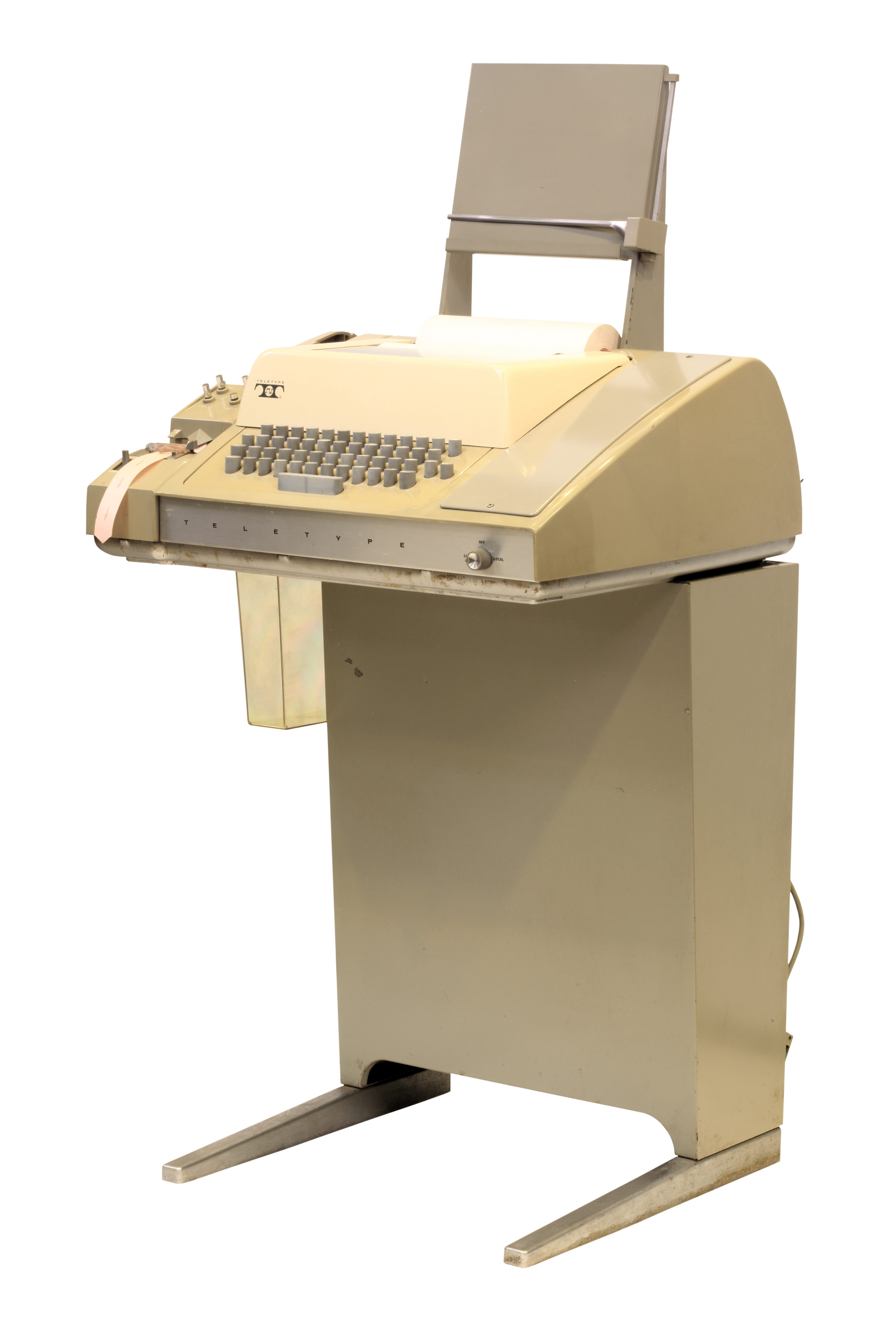
Model 33 Teleprinter, similar to the PDP-9's console device, though the PDP-9 had faster dedicated paper tape devices instead of the integrated reader/punch.

Among the improvements of the PDP-9 over its PDP-7 predecessor are:

- the addition of status flags for reader and punch errors, thus providing added flexibility and for error detection
- an entirely new design for multi-level interrupts, called the Automatic Priority Interrupt (API) option
- a more advanced form of memory management

User/university-based research projects for extending the PDP-9 include:

- a hardware capability for floating-point arithmetic, at a time when machines in this price range used software for floating-point arithmetic
- a PDP-9 controlled parallel computer

== Software ==
The system came with an OS that functions as single-user keyboard monitor, called ADSS (ADvanced Software System). DECsys provided an interactive, single-user, program development environment for Fortran and assembly language programs.

Both FORTRAN II and FORTRAN IV were implemented for the PDP-9.

MUMPS was originally developed on the PDP-7, and ran on several PDP-9s at the Massachusetts General Hospital.

== Sales ==
The PDP-7, of which 120 were sold, was described as "highly successful". The PDP-9 sold 445 units. Both have submodels, the PDP-7A (Note: sometimes identified by customers and media as PDP-7/A) and the PDP-9/L, (Note: yes, DEC had a "slash" for the 9/L but not for the 7A) neither of which accounted for a substantial percentage of sales. (Note: directly mentioned for one, calculated in the other case)

== See also ==
- Programmed Data Processor
- PDP-15 - successor to the PDP-9
