= IBM cassette tape =

Storage mechanism for IBM PCs

The original IBM Personal Computer and IBM PCjr includes support for storing data and programs on compact cassette tape.

It was common for home computers of the time, such as the Apple II, Commodore 64 and BBC Micro, to use cassette tapes for storage due to the lower cost of hardware and media compared to floppy disks. A wide range of commercial home computer software was available on tape throughout the 1980s.

BYTE asked in 1982, "I'm still looking for someone who uses [IBM cassette tape]. Did IBM seriously think its system would compete with the VIC-20 and ZX81?" The IBM PC cassette format was not popular since very few were shipped without at least one floppy disk drive, and apart from one diagnostic tape available from IBM, there seems never to have been any software sold on tape except IBM Typing Tutor created by Microsoft, and the interface was not included on the follow-up PC XT. Despite this lack of popularity, up until the original PC's discontinuation in 1987, IBM continued to offer a Model 104 which shipped without a floppy disk drive.

The IBM PCjr was also seldom sold without a floppy disk drive, but it also had two ROM cartridge slots for loading commercial software, which offered better convenience and reliability.

== Use ==
An IBM PC with just an external cassette recorder for storage can only use the built-in ROM BASIC as its operating system, which supports cassette operations. IBM PC DOS has no native support for cassette tapes, though software can be written to provide support.

BIOS interrupt call 15h routines are documented in the technical reference manual that turns the cassette motor on and off, and read or write data. Data is written with a lead-in section, and formatted in 256-byte blocks with a 2-byte CRC. Programmers can also operate the cassette relay by writing to its I/O address. The cassette, disk, advanced, and cartridge versions of IBM BASIC includes statements for cassette operations, but these features only work if the machine had a cassette port.

The data transfer speed is from 1-2 kilobits per second, compared to the disk drive's 250 kilobits per second.

In 2020, the cassette interfaces of the IBM PC and PCjr were utilized to boot FreeDOS off a custom vinyl disc.

== Data format ==
The technical reference for the IBM PC 5150 specifies that the WRITE-BLOCK routine turns on the cassette drive motor and transforms each byte into bits. A (1) bit corresponds to a 1.0 ms timer period, (0) bit corresponds to 0.5 ms, which results in a recording speed of 1000 - 2000 bit/s.

First 256 bytes of 11111111 is written. One synchronization bit 0. A synchronization byte of 0x16. 256-byte blocks of data and a 2-byte CRC is written until all data is transferred.

== Connector pinout ==
The IBM PC uses a female 5-pin DIN connector (the same as the keyboard connector) for the cassette port:

Pinout:

- Pin 1: MOTOR CONTROL COMMON
- Pin 2: GND
- Pin 3: MOTOR CONTROL (6 V/1 A) RELAY
- Pin 4: DATA-IN (500 nA with 13 V at 1000-2000 Baud)
- Pin 5: DATA-OUT (250 μA jumperable either at 0.68 V ("AUX") or 75 mV ("MIC"))

Motor control: 8255A port 0x61, bit 3: 0 = on, 1 = off.

== See also ==
- Commodore Datasette
- IBM Cassette BASIC
- Kansas City standard
- Tarbell Cassette Interface
