= Kansas City standard =

Data storage standard

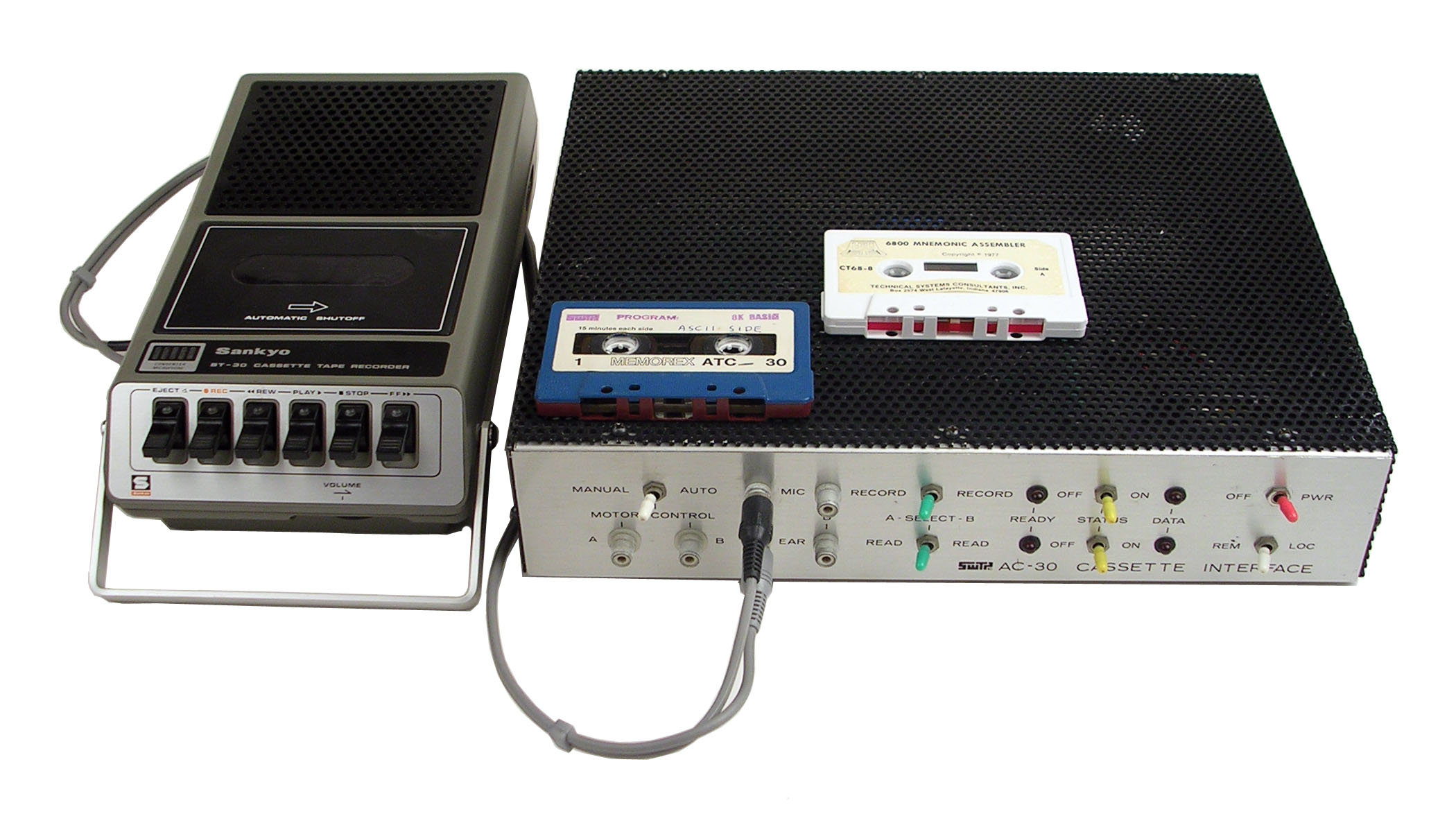
The SWTPC AC-30 Cassette Interface implements the Kansas City standard. In May 1976, it was sold for US$80 (equivalent to about $500 in 2025).

The Kansas City standard (KCS), or Byte standard, is a data storage protocol for standard cassette tapes or other audio recording media at 300 bits per second. It originated in a symposium sponsored by Byte magazine in November 1975 in Kansas City, Missouri, to develop a standard for the storage of digital microcomputer data on inexpensive consumer quality cassettes. The first systems based on the standard appeared in 1976.

One variation on the basic standard is CUTS, which is identical at 300 bit/s, but with an optional 1200 bit/s mode. CUTS is the default encoding used by several later machine families, including those from Acorn and the MSX. MSX added a higher 2400 bit/s mode that is otherwise similar. The 1200 bit/s mode of CUTS was used as the standard for cross-platform BASICODE distribution.

KCS originated from the earliest days of the microcomputer revolution, among other prolific protocols. Most home computers of the era have unique formats without any intercompatibility.

== History ==
Early microcomputers generally use punched tape for program storage, an expensive option. Computer consultant Jerry Ogdin conceived the use of audio tones on a cassette to replace the paper tapes. He took the idea to Les Solomon, editor of Popular Electronics magazine, who was similarly frustrated by punched tapes. In September 1975, the two co-authored an article on the HITS (Hobbyists' Interchange Tape System), using two tones to represent 1s and 0s. Soon after, several manufacturers started using similar approaches, all incompatible.

Wayne Green, who had just started Byte magazine, wanted all the manufacturers to collaborate on a single cassette standard. He organized a two-day meeting on 7–8 November 1975 in Kansas City, Missouri. The participants settled on a system based on Don Lancaster's design. After the meeting, Lee Felsenstein (of Processor Technology) and Harold Mauch (of Percom) wrote the standard, which was published in Byte magazine's first issue.

A KCS cassette interface is similar to a modem connected to a serial port. The 1s and 0s from the serial port are converted to audio tones using audio frequency-shift keying (AFSK). A "0" bit is represented as four cycles of a 1200 Hz sine wave, and a "1" bit as eight cycles of 2400 Hz. This gives a data rate of 300 baud. Each frame starts with one "0" start bit, followed by eight data bits (least significant bit first) followed by two "1" stop bits, so each frame is 11 bits, for a data rate of 27 3/11 bytes per second.

The February 1976 issue of Byte has a report on the symposium, and the March issue features two hardware examples by Don Lancaster and Harold Mauch. The 300 baud rate is reliable, but slow; a typical 8-kilobyte BASIC program takes five minutes to load. Most audio cassette circuits support higher speeds.

According to Solomon, the efforts were unsuccessful: "Unfortunately, it didn't last long; before the month ended, everyone went back to his own tape standard and the recording confusion got worse."

The participants of the Kansas City symposium include these:

- Ray Borrill, Bloomington, Indiana
- Hal Chamberlin, The Computer Hobbyist, Raleigh, North Carolina
- Richard Smith, The Computer Hobbyist, Raleigh, North Carolina
- Tom Durston, MITS, Albuquerque, New Mexico
- Bill Gates, MITS, Albuquerque, New Mexico
- Ed Roberts, MITS, Albuquerque, New Mexico
- Bob Zaller, MITS, Albuquerque, New Mexico
- Lee Felsenstein, LGC Engineering / Processor Technology, Berkeley, California
- Les Solomon, Popular Electronics Magazine, New York, New York
- Bob Marsh, Processor Technology, Berkeley, California
- Joe Frappier, Mikra-D, Bellingham, Massachusetts
- Gary Kay, Southwest Technical Products Corp, San Antonio, Texas
- Harold A Mauch, Pronetics/Percom Data, Garland, Texas
- Bob Nelson, Pacific Cyber/Metrix, San Ramon, California
- George Perrine, HAL Communications Corp, Urbana, Illinois
- Paul Tucker, HAL Communications Corp, Urbana, Illinois
- Michael Stolowitz, Godbout Electronics, Oakland, California
- Mike Wise, Sphere Corporation, Bountiful, Utah

== Format and enhancements ==
The original standard records data as "marks" (one) and "spaces" (zero). A mark bit consists of eight cycles at a frequency of 2400 Hz, and a space bit consists of four cycles at a frequency of 1200 Hz. A word, usually one byte (8 bits) long, is recorded in little endian order, which is least significant bit first. 7-bit words are followed by a parity bit. As each 8-bit byte is encoded into 11-bits for transmission, the total throughput is 27 bytes per second.

=== Tarbell ===
The Tarbell Cassette Interface, which, according to early PC retailer Stan Veit, "became a de facto standard for S-100 computers", supported the Kansas City Standard in addition to the Tarbell "native" mode ("Tarbell standard"). The Tarbell standard is very different than the KC standard: it records "1" as "01" and "0" as "10", and typically ran at 1500 bit/s (187 bytes per second, 3000 Hz). 300-baud KC support is implemented by recording "1" as 00000000 (hence "1010" ×4) and "0" as 01010101 ("1001" ×4) at 4800 Hz.

=== CUTS ===
Processor Technology developed the popular CUTS (Computer Users Tape Standard), which works at either 300 or 1200 baud. The 1200 baud version simply reduced the number of cycles per bit, with a mark being two cycles of 2400 and a space being one cycle at 1200. It was otherwise the same as the original KC standard, with a single "0" for the start bit and two trailing "1"s as stop bits, giving an effective data rate of 873 bits per second. The company provided the S-100 bus CUTS Tape I/O interface board, which offers both CUTS and Kansas City standard support to any S-100 system.

==== Quick CUTS ====
The Quick CUTS standard proposed by Bob Cottis and Mike Blandford and published in the Amateur Computer Club newsletter operated at 2400 baud, encoding "0" as a half-cycle of 1200 Hz and "1" as a whole cycle of 2400 Hz. The receiver was self-clocking using a phase-locked loop. Published in 1978, it predates the 1982 patent for the similar coded mark inversion proposal (but not its priority date of July 27, 1978).

==== BBC Micro ====
Acorn Computers Ltd used a variation of 1200 baud CUTS for the BBC Micro, which removed one of the two stop bits to improve the throughput to 960 bits per second. Additionally, the machines used a format for data that broke files into 256-byte blocks which included sequence numbers; if there was an error during a read, the user could rewind the tape far enough to get past the bad block and try again. The system would ignore those blocks that had been previously loaded successfully.

==== MSX ====
MSX supports both the 1200 baud variation of the CUTS standard, as well as a new 2400 baud variant which encodes a "0" bit as one cycle of a 2400 Hz wave and a "1" bit as two cycles of a 4800 Hz wave. This gives an effective rate of approximately 1,745 bits per second. The machine's BIOS can read data at up to 3600 baud from an ideal audio source.

== Implementations ==
=== Early microcomputers ===
Several use the S-100 bus.

- Compukit UK101
- Exidy Sorcerer Optional S-100 expansion bus, standard 300 bit/s mode and a 1200 baud variant by default.
- Kim-1, MOS Technology Optional S-100 expansion bus (KIMSI), standard 300 bit/s mode and a hypertype 1200 baud variant.
- Lucas Nascom 1, 2 (which also supports a 1200 bit/s variant, see below)
- MITS Altair 8800
- Motorola MEK D1 6800 board
- Processor Tech Sol-20 Terminal Computer
- Processor Tech CUTS S-100 bus Tape I/O interface board
- SWTPC's Motorola 6800-based computers
- Tangerine Microtan 65 (300 baud CUTS — faster 2400 non-CUTS format also available)
- Eltec (German Company) Eurocom 1
- Z80 Starter Kit (1977 — Development board by SD Systems — 300 bauds — S-100 bus)

=== Personal computers ===
- ABC 80
- Acorn Computers Ltd
  - Acorn System 1 (300 baud only)
  - Acorn Atom (300 baud standard / 1200 baud with the "fast cos" program from utility pack 1)
  - BBC Micro (300 and 1200 baud variations)
  - Acorn Electron (1200 baud only)
- Dick Smith Super-80 (300 baud only)
- Elektor Magazine National SC/MP Project
- Heathkit
  - Heathkit ET/ETW-3400 and 3400A Microprocessor Trainers (300, 1200, 2400 baud)
  - Heathkit H8 (300 and 1200 baud)
  - Zenith Z-89 — also sold as the Heathkit H89 (300 and 1200 baud)
- MicroBee Systems
  - MicroBee (300 and 1200 baud)
- MSX (1200 and 2400 baud)
- Nascom (300 and 1200)
- Ohio Scientific C1P/Superboard II, C2-4P/C4P, C2-8P/C8P
- Sega SC-3000 A slightly different 600 baud variant
- Triumph-Adler
  - Alphatronic PC
  - Alphatronic PC16
- Z80NE Nova Elettronica with LX.385 interface
- Chaos Homebrew Computer
- Irisha (1200 baud, 2 stop bits, same as MSX)

=== Programmable calculators ===
- Casio
  - FX-502P series with FA-1 interface (300 baud)
  - FX-602P series and FX-702P with FA-2 interface (300 baud)
  - Casio FX-603P and Casio FX-850P with FA-6 interface (300 and 1200 baud)
  - Casio FX-750P with FA-20 interface (300 baud)
  - Casio PB-700 with FA-11 interface (300 baud)

=== Other devices ===
- Casio PT-50 electronic keyboard with TA-1 tape interface module.
- Roland TR-707 drum machine and other musical equipment.

== Alternative formats ==
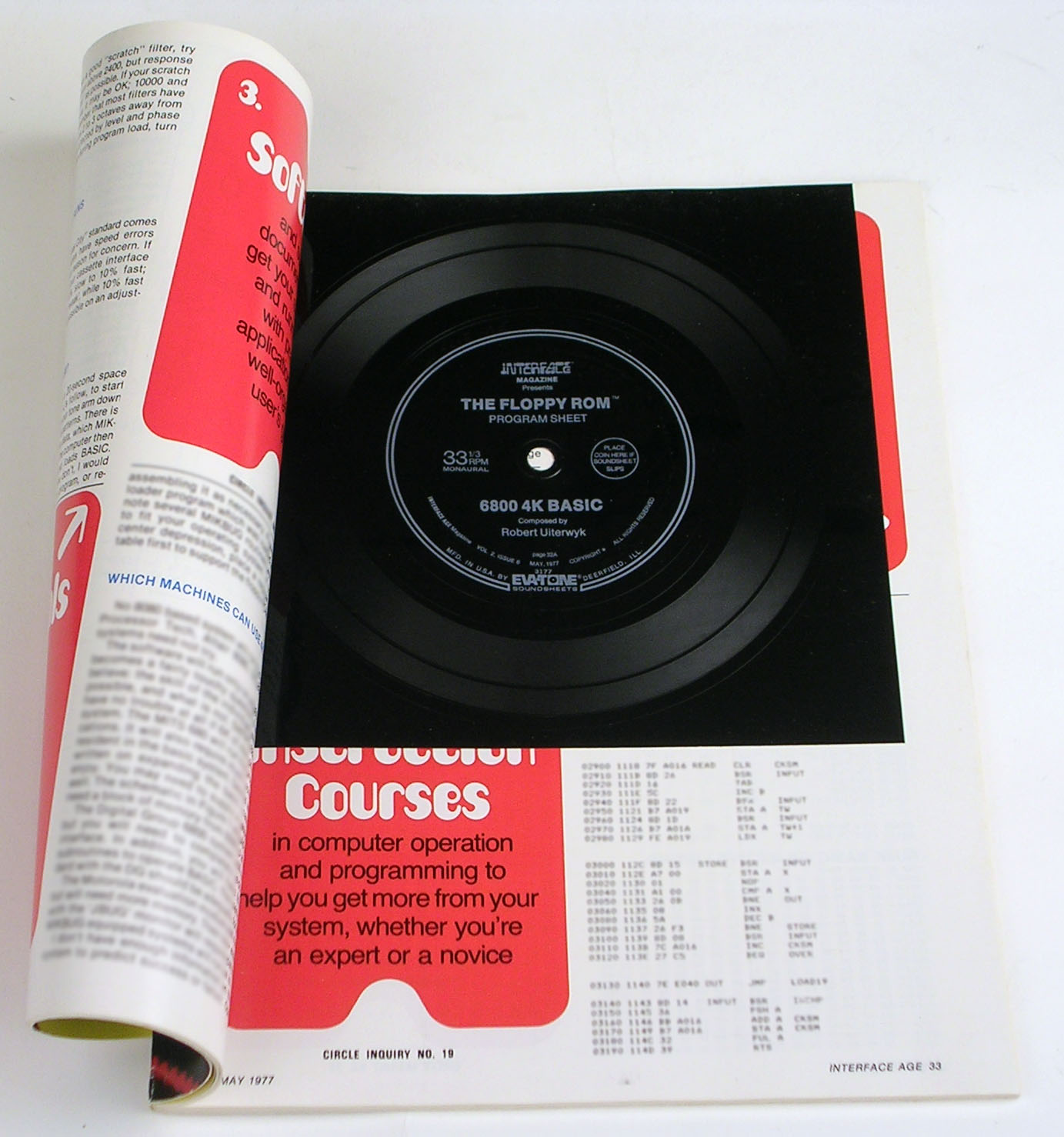
Interface Age magazine May 1977 issue, with a Kansas City standard flexi disc floppy ROM

In August 1976 at the Personal Computing show in Atlantic City, New Jersey, Bob Marsh of Processor Technology approached Bob Jones, the publisher of Interface Age magazine, about pressing software onto vinyl records. Processor Technology provided an Intel 8080 program to be recorded. This test record did not work and Processor Technology was unable to devote more time to the effort. Daniel Meyer and Gary Kay of Southwest Technical Products (SWTPC) arranged for Robert Uiterwyk to provide his 4K BASIC interpreter program for the Motorola 6800 microprocessor. The idea was to record the program on audio tape in the Kansas City format and then make a master record from the tape. Eva-Tone made Soundsheets on thin vinyl that would hold one song, these were inexpensive and could be bound in a magazine. Bill Turner and Bill Blomgren of MicroComputerSystems Inc. along with Bob Jones^{[8]} of Interface Age and Bud Schamburger of Holiday Inn worked with Eva-Tone and developed a successful process. The intermediate stage of recording to tape produced dropouts, so a SWTPC AC-30 cassette interface was connected directly to the record cutting equipment. The May 1977 issue of Interface Age contains the first "Floppy ROM", a 33 1/3 RPM record containing about six minutes of Kansas City standard audio. The September 1978 Floppy ROM Number 5 has two sides: Apple BASIC, "the automated dress pattern", and IAPS format, "A program for writing letters".

== See also ==
- BASICODE
- Commodore Datasette
- Fast loader
- Flexi disc
- IBM cassette tape
- Tarbell Cassette Interface
- Unified Emulator Format
