= Tandy 10 Business Computer System =

Radio Shack computer sold from 1978–1980

- Developer: Radio Shack
- Manufacturer: Applied Digital Data Systems (ADDS)
- Released: 1978; 48 years ago
- Introductory price: 8995 US$ (today $44401.34)
- Discontinued: late 1980
- Media: Two dual-sided 8" diskette drives
- Operating system: ADOS Disk Operating System
- CPU: 8080
- Memory: 48K
- Display: 80 x 24 text display

The Tandy 10 Business Computer System is a product developed by Radio Shack in the late 1970s as a business-oriented complement to its TRS-80 Model I desktop computer. Released in 1978, the Tandy 10 was built for Radio Shack by Applied Digital Data Systems (ADDS), and was only sold by Radio Shack's dedicated computer center stores.

The computer is about the size of a two-drawer filing cabinet, with a monitor and keyboard built into a desk-shaped console, along with two 8-inch floppy drives vertically mounted in the pedestal. Features include:

- 8080 CPU
- 48K memory
- 80 x 24 video display
- Two dual-sided 8" diskette drives
- Dartmouth BASIC
- ADOS Disk Operating System

Optional:

- Fortran IV language
- Assembly Language program language

The original ADDS machine, the System 50, was intended to be used as a data entry system and not as a standalone computer. It has a form designer; data is entered into the form and sent via RS-232 to a mainframe. Since it has a microprocessor, Tandy matched it up with Peachtree Accounting software to market it as a business computer.

The system did not sell in large numbers. Radio Shack's next business system is an extension of the TRS-80 product line, the TRS-80 Model II, released in May 1979. The Tandy 10 was discontinued in late 1980.
