= Commodore Datasette =

Dedicated magnetic tape data storage device

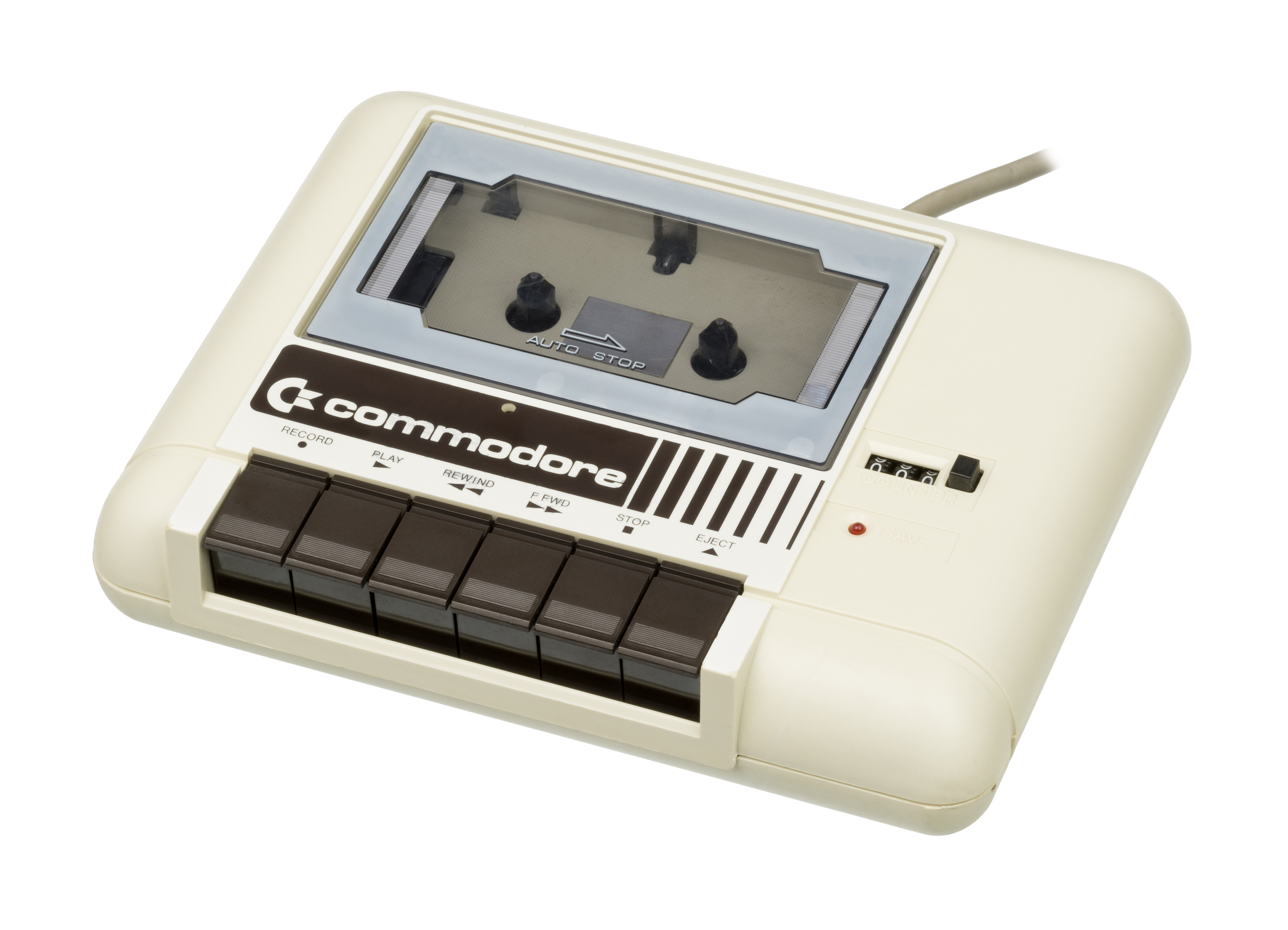
The third, most common version of the 1530 C2N Datassette

The Commodore 1530 (C2N) Datasette, later also Datassette (a portmanteau of data and cassette), is Commodore's dedicated magnetic-tape data storage device. Using compact cassettes as the storage medium, it provides inexpensive storage to Commodore's 8-bit computers, including the PET, VIC-20, and Commodore 64. A physically similar model, Commodore 1531, was made for the Commodore 16 and Plus/4 series computers.

== Features ==
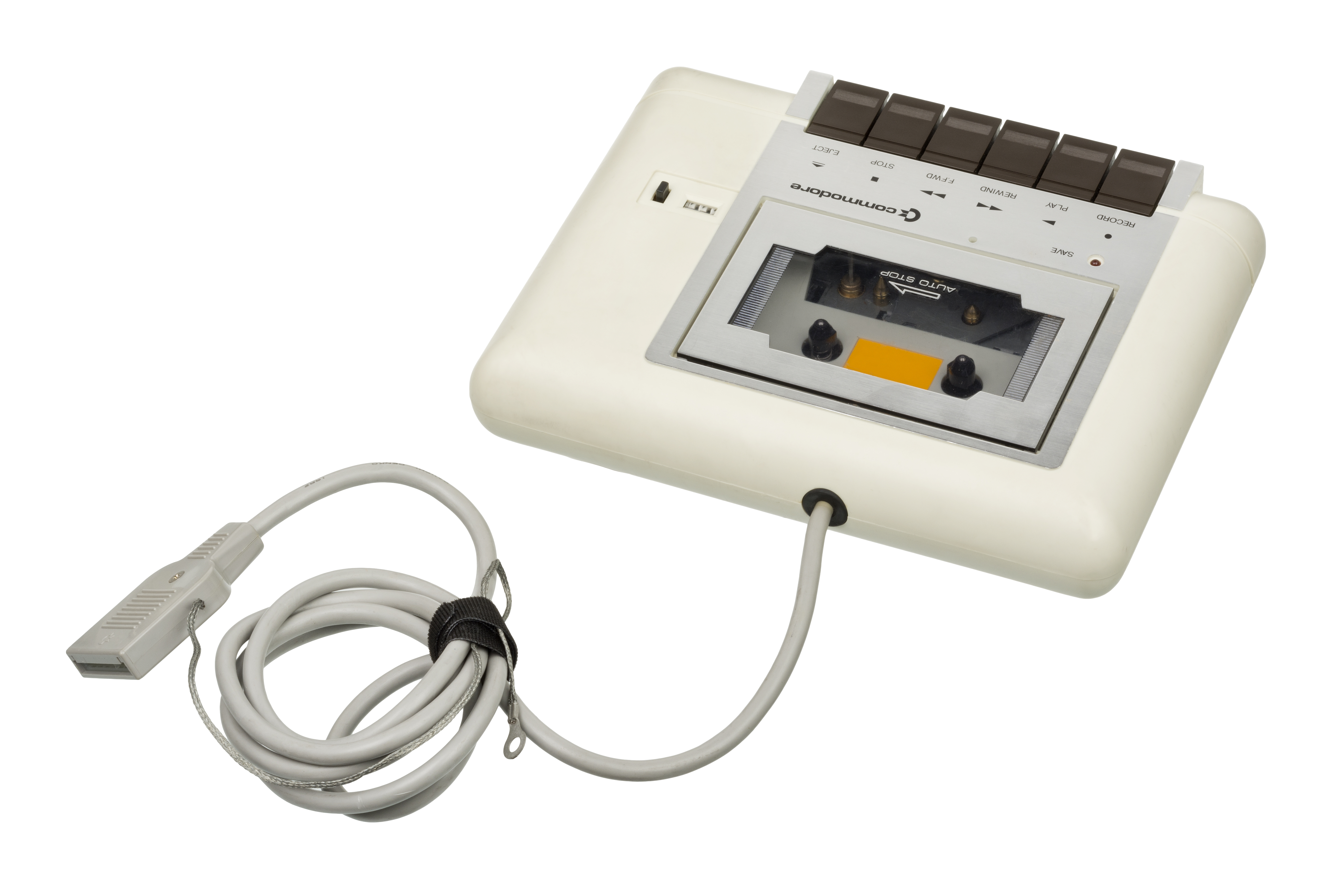
The connection cable to the Datasette

Earlier compact cassette-based formats were generally handled by expansion cards in machines like the Apple II or S-100 bus computers. These would convert the digital data to analog form using a variety of techniques, and then send the resulting audio to a standard cassette player using RCA jacks or 3.5mm phone jacks.

In contrast, the Datasette sends digital data directly to the connector output. This produces a series of square waves on the cassette. The data is recorded using pulse-width modulation, using three different pulse lengths, short, medium, and long, which are timed by the system. On NTSC systems, the short pulse is about 176 μs, 256 μs for medium, and 336 μs for long. Due to the signals ultimately being derived from the system clock, on PAL systems the pulses are longer at 183, 266, and 349 μs, respectively.

Each bit of the original data is written using Manchester code, which ensures there is a transition from 1 to 0 or 0 to 1 for every recorded bit. In the Datasette, data bits are recorded in pairs of signals. "0" is written by a 256 μs pulse and 256 μs pause followed by a 176 μs pulse and 176 μs pause, or medium-medium-short-short. A "1" reverses this, short-short-medium-medium. Both bits thus take up 864 μs. Additionally, a series of long-long-medium-medium transitions is used to mark the start of each byte, and a parity bit is added to the end. In total, a byte of data requires a 1184 sync + eight bits and a parity bit of 864, for a total of 8960 μs. This corresponds to a byte timing of about 111 Hz, or about 888 bits/second. When recorded to tape, the tape's natural hysteresis smooths out these sharp signals. The resulting signal, when listened to on an audio deck, sounds like a series of shifting tones, around 5,700 Hz for short and 3,900 for medium, alternating back and forth rapidly.

On playback, the signal is not a sharp digital one, but a smoothed-out representation of the original. To address this, additional circuitry in the Datasette looks for the signal edges and sends a pure digital signal back to the host computer. This compensates for other effects as well, like tape stretch and slight differences in tape speed or computer speed (like NTSC vs. PAL). By timing the transitions from 0 to 1 or vice versa as they arrive, the computer can determine whether it is receiving a short or medium pulse first, and then re-create the original data 1 or 0. Programs are written twice to tape for error correction; if an error is detected when reading the first recording, the computer corrects it with data from the second.

Using a digital format like this addresses problems commonly seen on those systems that use normal analog cassette decks for storage. Such decks include amplifier systems to boost or mute down the original signal to a level suitable for recording. These circuits can drift, requiring the user to change the volume setting on their deck to compensate. Different decks have different recording levels, and may require adjustment to be used. Also, depending on the type of connection, the signal may be split between two tracks, making it too quiet to be reliably reconstructed. In the Datasette, the data is directed directly to the tape on a selected channel with no adjustments needed. This sort of all-digital or near-digital recording is a feature of some other home computer cassette-based systems, like the Atari Program Recorder and the HITS system for S-100 computers. Because of its digital format the Datasette is more reliable than purely-analog data cassette systems.

However, it is also very slow. Although bits are encoded at around 900 bps, gaps between the bytes, the block recording style and other effects greatly reduce the total throughout to about 50 bytes per second. This is not necessarily inherent to the underlying digital encoding scheme; the similar HITS system generally operated around twice that speed. This leaves the system with considerable potential improvements.

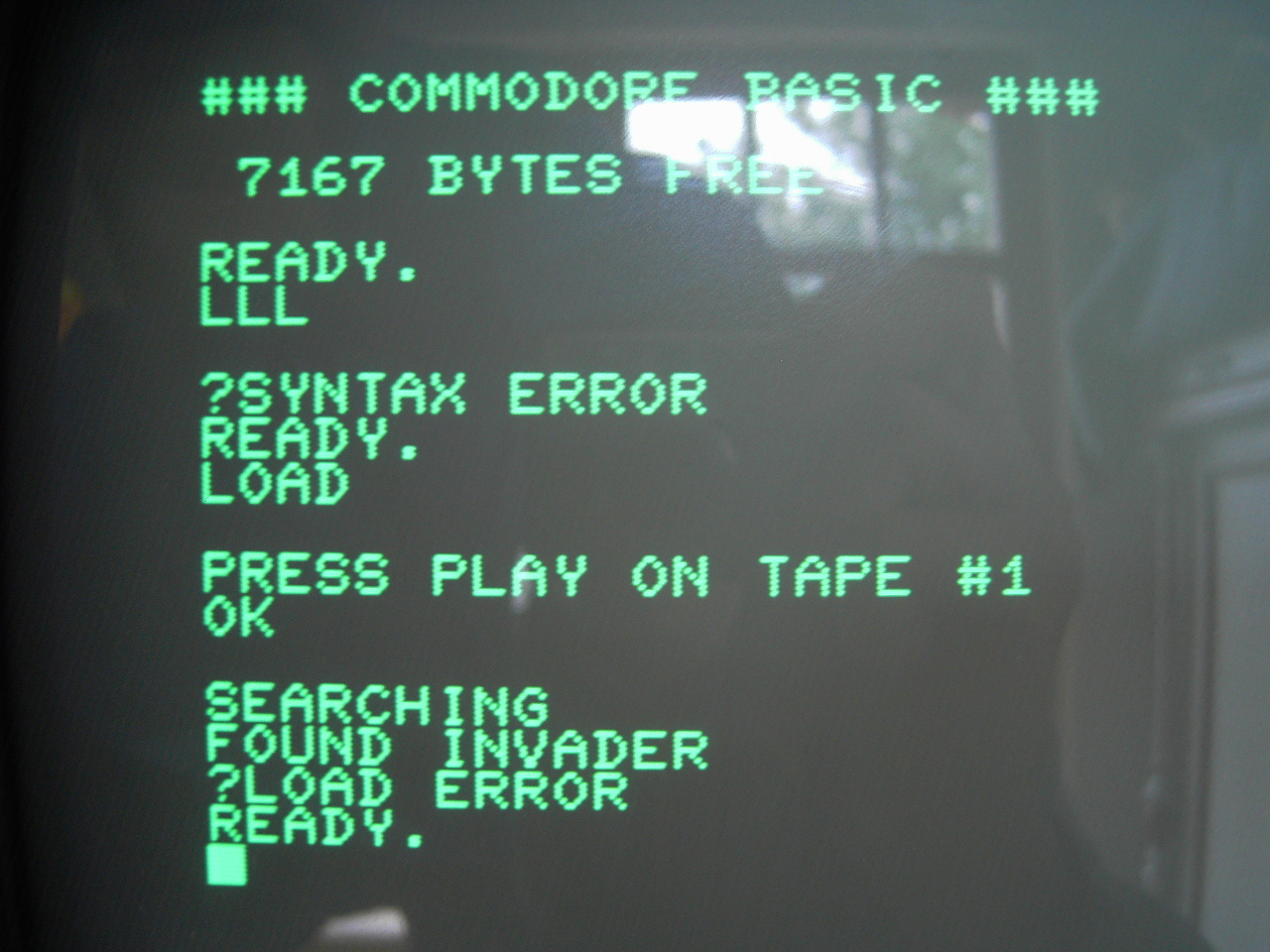
The Datasette loading process

The Datasette connects to the computer via a proprietary edge connector (Commodore 1530) or mini-DIN connector (1531). The absence of recordable audio signals on this interface makes the Datasette and clones the only cassette recorders usable with Commodore computers, until aftermarket converters made the use of ordinary recorders possible. The original Datasette connector uses a 0.156-inch (4.0 mm)–spacing PCB edge connector at the computer end. All input/output signals to the Datasette are digital; digital-to-analog conversion, and vice versa, is handled within the unit. Power is also included in this cable. The pinout is ground, +5 V DC, motor, read, write, key-sense. The sense signal monitors the play, rewind, and fast-forward buttons but cannot differentiate between them. A mechanical interlock prevents any two of them from being pressed at the same time. The motor power is derived from the computer's unregulated 9 V DC supply via a transistor circuit.

Datasettes can typically store about 100 kByte per 30 minute side.

=== Turbo Tape ===
After the Datasette's launch, special turbo tape software appeared, providing much faster loading and saving. The tape uses a more compact recording format. Such software was integrated into most commercial prerecorded applications (mostly games), as well as being available separately for loading and saving the users' homemade programs and data. These programs were only widely used in Europe, as the US market had long since moved onto disks. The use of turbo tape and other fast loaders increases the storage on one side of a tape to roughly 1000 kByte.

TurboTape is typical of these systems. While it still uses pulse-width modulation, it uses a very different system to achieve it. Instead of looking whether the first half of the bit data is long or short delay compared to the second half, as is the case with the original format, TurboTape records only one transition per bit. Instead of using the previous transition to time it, it sets an internal counter inside the computer that is counting down from 1 to 0. If a 1 is received before the counter has transitioned, then the pulse must have been short, meaning it is a 0. If the timer has become zero before the 1 is received, the original data is a 1. This not only means there is one transition per bit instead of two, it also is far simpler to implement in software, allowing it to run with much shorter timers.

To further improve performance, TurboTape does not use a packet format, and writes all of the data out as a single long series of bits, with a single checksum at the end of the file. This also eliminates the need for the long byte markers and the parity bits, further improving total throughout.

== Encoding ==
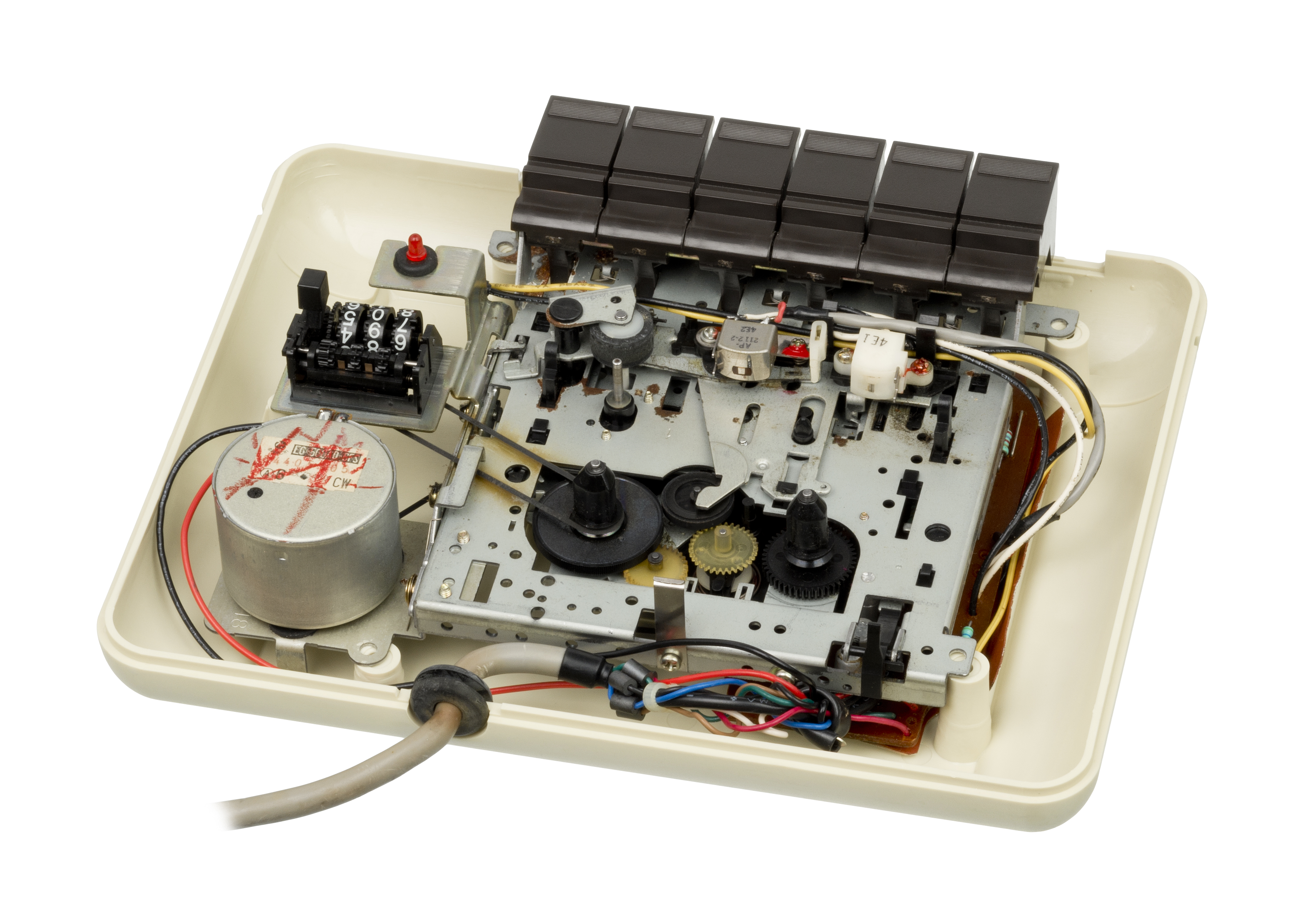
Inside the Datasette

Datasette sound sample
Commodore Datasette 18-second sound sample

=== Standard ===
To record physical data, the zero-crossing from positive to negative voltage of the analog signal is measured. The resulting time between these positive to negative crossings is then compared to a threshold to determine whether the time since the last crossing is short, medium, or long. Note the lower amplitude for the shorter periods.

Inside the tape device the read head signal is fed into an operational amplifier (1) whose output signal is DC-filtered. Op-amp (2) amplifies and feeds an RC filter. Op-amp (3) amplifies the signal again followed by another DC filter. Op-amp (4) amplifies the signal into clipping the sine-formed signal. The positive and negative rails for all op-amps are wired to +5V DC and GND. The clipped signal therefore fits into the TTL electrical level window of the Schmitt trigger step that in turn feeds the digital cassette port.

A circuit in the tape unit transforms the analog signal into a logical 1 or 0, which is then transmitted to the computer via the tape connector. Inside the computer, the first Complex Interface Adapter (6526) in the C64 senses when the signal goes from one to zero. This event is called trigger and causes an interrupt request. This event can be handled by a handler code, or simply discovered by testing bit 4 of location $DC0D. The points that trigger this event are indicated by the black circles in the figure.

A combination of pulse lengths are used to encode four signals:

- 0, as short followed by medium
- 1, as medium followed by short
- byte marker, as long followed by medium
- end-of-data, as long followed by short

Because of clock differences between the PAL and NTSC versions, the length of the pulses are also different: 176, 256, 336 μs for NTSC; 183, 266, 349 μs for PAL. Each byte in the standard recording is structured as byte marker + LSB...MSB + parity bit. As a result, each byte occupies 4480 μs (NTSC), for a data rate of 223.2 bytes/s inside each data block. The datablock contains additional structures such as synchronization tones (blocks of short pulses).

Decoded bits are read into a shift register to turn them into 8-bit-wide bytes.

=== Turbo Tape ===
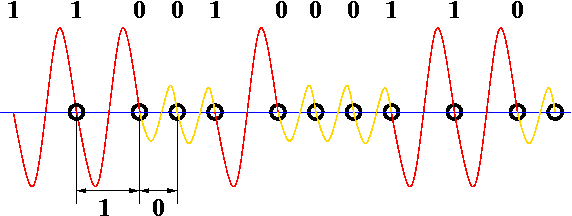
The resulting waveform from storing Turbo Tape data

Turbo Tape uses a different encoding of bits: the 0 is recorded as a single short pulse and the 1 is recorded as a single medium pulse, approximately doubling the bit-density. There is also no special byte header. A single 8-bit checksum replaces the per-byte parity.

To allow regular computers to read a turbo-tape, such tapes are prefaced with a decoder program written in the standard encoding. Decoders are as small as 10 bytes. The decoder monitors the $DCOD location to make its own assessment of pulse length using the timers on the interface adapters.

Once the turbo-bits can be decoded, they are fed into a shift register (the endianness depends on the loader used to write the tape) and are continuously compared to a special 8-bit sequence. This bit sequence can also be seen as a byte. A bit-sequence match means that the stream is byte-synchronized. The first byte to compare with is called the lead-in byte. If matched, it's compared to the sync byte as well.

An example: Turbo Tape 64 has a lead-in byte $02 (binary 00000010), sync byte $09 (binary 00001001) and a following sync sequence of $08, $07, $06, $05, $04, $03, $02, $01.

== Models ==
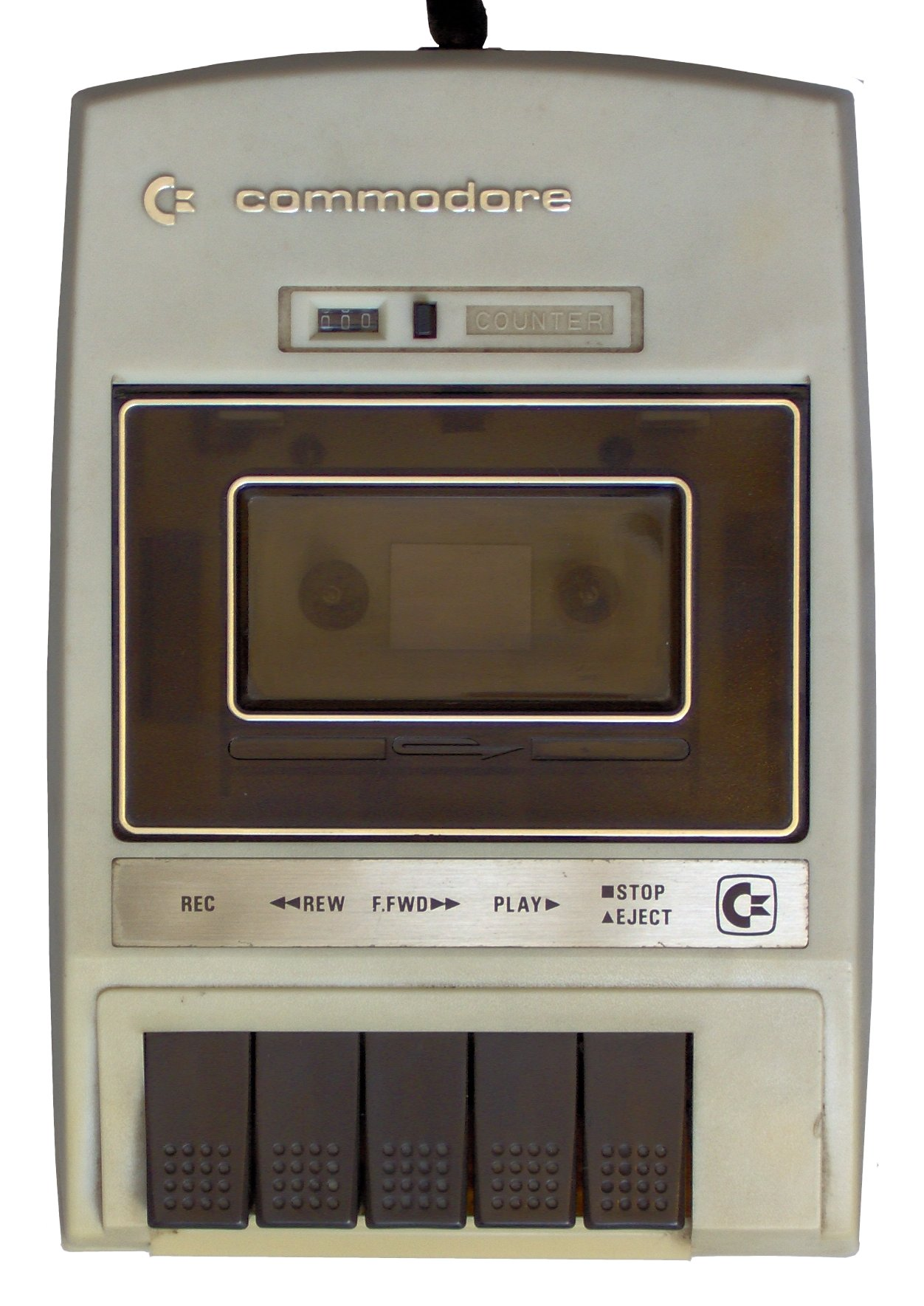
The C2N Cassette Unit, the original Datasette model shape

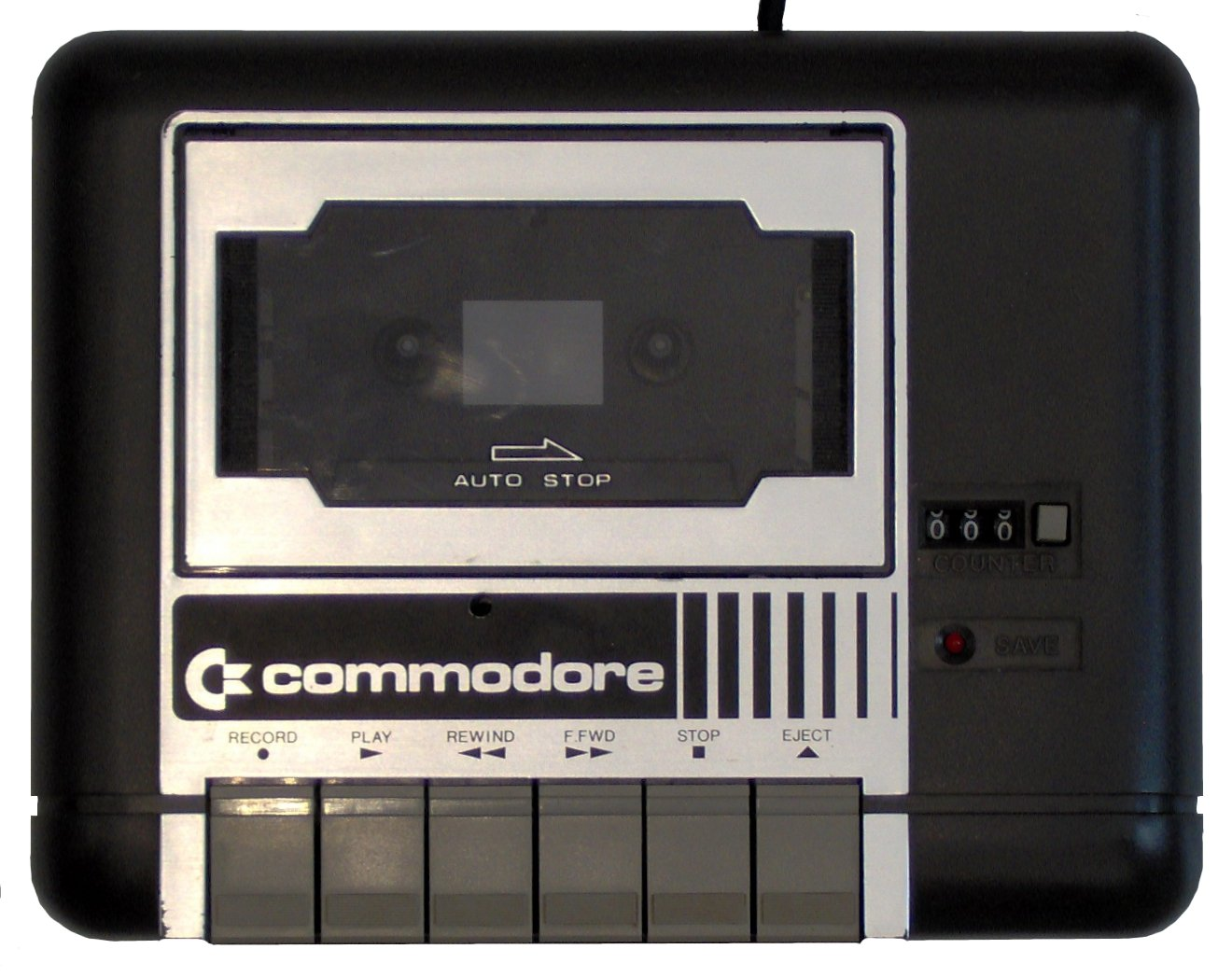
Datassette 1531

=== PET, VIC-20, C64/128 ===
There are at least four main models of the 1530/C2N Datassette:

- The original modified Sanyo M1540A cassette drive, built into the earliest models of PET in 1977. This was a standard shoebox tape recorder with a corner of the case removed and modified electronics; a Commodore PCB was installed internally in place of the Sanyo electronics. To disguise the Sanyo brand, Commodore simply fitted a Commodore badge over the original logo.
- The second built-in Datassette in the PET 2001: another standard consumer model (sold in some markets as CCE CCT1020) modified with a Commodore PCB. Black cassette lid, five white keys, no tape counter, no SAVE LED
- Black body original-shape model, black cassette lid, five black keys, no tape counter, no SAVE LED
- White body original-shape model, black cassette lid, five black keys, with tape counter, no SAVE LED
- White body new-shape model, silver cassette lid, six black keys, with white tape counter SAVE LED on left side
- White body new-shape model, silver cassette lid, six black keys, with tape counter and a red SAVE LED on the right
- As above but with black pattern and silvery Commodore logo, six black keys, tape counter and a red SAVE LED on right side

The first two external models were made as PET peripherals, and styled after the PET 2001 built-in tape drive. The latter two were styled and marketed for the VIC-20 and C64. All 1530s are compatible with all those computers, as well as the C128.

In addition to this, some models came with a small hole above the keys, to allow access to the adjustment screw of the tape head azimuth position. A small screwdriver can thus easily be used to affect the adjustment without disassembling the Datassette's chassis.

Confusingly, the Datassette at various times was sold both as the C2N DATASETTE UNIT Model 1530 and as the 1530 DATASSETTE UNIT Model C2N. Note the difference in spelling (one S versus two) used on the original product packaging.

Like Datasette models, the recording format is compatible across computers; the VIC, for example, can read PET cassettes.

=== C16/116 and Plus/4 ===
Similar in physical appearance to the 1530/C2N models is the Commodore 1531, made for the Commodore 16 and Plus/4 series computers. This has a Mini-DIN connector in place of the PCB edge connector. This can be used with a C64/128 via an adaptor, which was supplied by Commodore with some units.

- Black/charcoal body new shape model, silver cassette lid, six light gray keys, with tape counter and a red SAVE LED

== Popularity ==
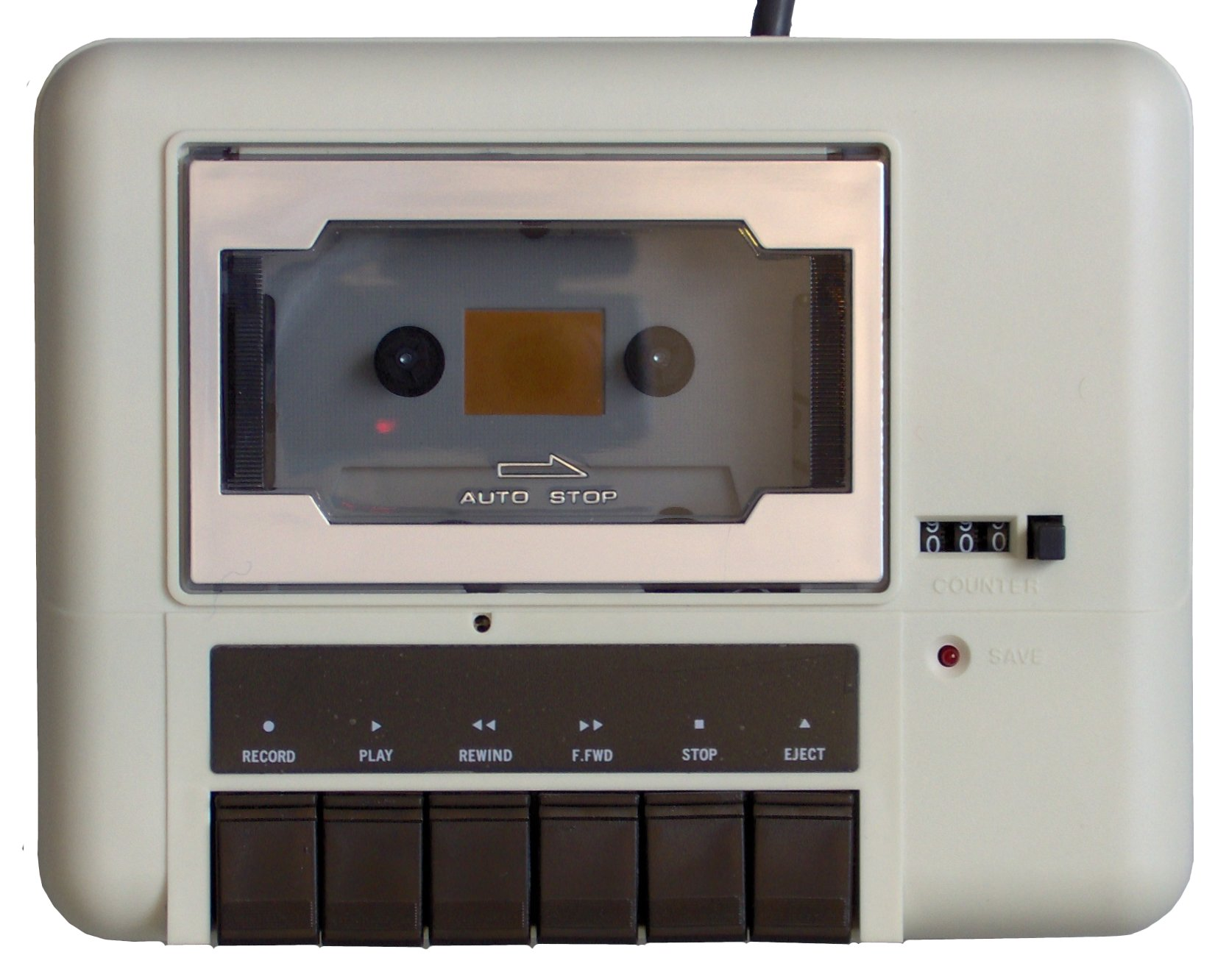
One of the few clones, a Phonemark model 4403

The Datasette was more popular outside than inside the United States. U.S. Gold, which imported American computer games to Britain, often had to wait until they were converted from disk because most British Commodore 64 owners used tape, while the US magazine Compute!'s Gazette reported that by 1983 "90 percent of new Commodore 64 owners bought a disk drive with their computer". Computer Gaming World reported in 1986 that British cassette-based software had failed in the United States because "97% of the Commodore systems in the USA have disk drives"; by contrast, MicroProse reported in 1987 that 80% of its 100,000 sales of Gunship in the UK were on cassette. In the United States disk drives quickly became standard, despite the 1541 costing roughly five times as much as a Datasette. In most parts of Europe, the Datasette was the medium of choice for several years after its launch, although floppy disk drives were generally available. The inexpensive and widely available audio cassettes made the Datasette a good choice for the budget-aware home computer mass market.

== See also ==
- Famicom Data Recorder
- Fast loader
- IBM cassette tape
- Kansas City standard
- Magnetic-tape data storage
