= Applied Digital Data Systems =

Video display terminal supplier

Applied Digital Data Systems, Inc. (ADDS), was a supplier of video display computer terminals, founded in 1969 by Leeam Lowin and William J. Catacosinos. Lowin simultaneously founded Solid State Data Sciences (SSDS). SSDS was one of the first developers of the MOS/LSI integrated circuits that were key to ADDS's product line. Other founders included David Ophir, Ray Borrill, and two manufacturers' representatives whose names are not currently known. Borrill claims that he came up with the name of the company.

It became a subsidiary of NCR Corporation in 1980, which sold the Mentor 2000 professional computer in the United States in 1986.

The Mentor 2000 ran at 5 MHz using a Zilog processor, 640 KB RAM, and included one 60MB hard disk. It used the Pick operating system and database management system. It was able to manage 16 or 32 video terminals at once.

ADDS (along with NCR) was later part of AT&T, then independent briefly before being acquired by SunRiver Data Systems.

However, their version of the Pick operating system was acquired by Pick Systems Inc, now called TigerLogic. That version is now called mvBase. MvBase was sold to Rocket Software in 2013.

== See also ==
- Tandy 10 Business Computer System
