= Ray Borrill =

- Born: June 10, 1931
- Died: September 19, 2006 (aged 75); Bloomington, Indiana, USA

Boyd Raymond 'Ray' Borrill was founder of The Data Domain, a retail computer store in Bloomington, Indiana, and vice-president of itty bitty machine company retail computer store, December 1975 – 1980, located in Evanston, Illinois. These stores have their place in computer history as they are not only among the first several storefront computer retail shops, but also were two of the first computer stores to sell the Apple I computer, the MITS Altair 8800, as well as numerous other now highly collectible products from microcomputer history. The dealer arrangement was made by Steve Jobs. The Data Domain is also believed to be the first to ever use the phrase "Personal Computer" commercially. These stores are the first retail outlets for personal computers. Items could be purchased as either complete assembled and tested, or as kits.

In 1975, Borrill was one of the participants of the Kansas City symposium, which established the Kansas City standard, a standard format for recording data on audio cassette tapes. The Kansas City standard format allowed for exchange of data between microcomputers. Many pioneers of the microcomputer industry, such as Bill Gates while working for MITS, were also in attendance.

Borrill also reported that he was a co-founder of Applied Digital Data Systems (ADDS) and came up with the name. ADDS manufactured some popular video display terminals in the 1970s.
