= Percom =

Percom Data Corporation
- Company type: Limited company
- Industry: Electronics, microcomputer
- Founded: Garland, Texas (1976)
- Fate: Purchased by Esprit Systems in 1984
- Products: floppy disk systems

Percom Data Corporation was an early microcomputer company formed in 1976 to sell peripherals into the emerging microcomputer market. They are best known for their floppy disk systems, first for S-100 machines, and the later for other platforms like the TRS-80 and Atari 8-bit computers. The company was purchased by Esprit Systems in 1984.

== Origins ==
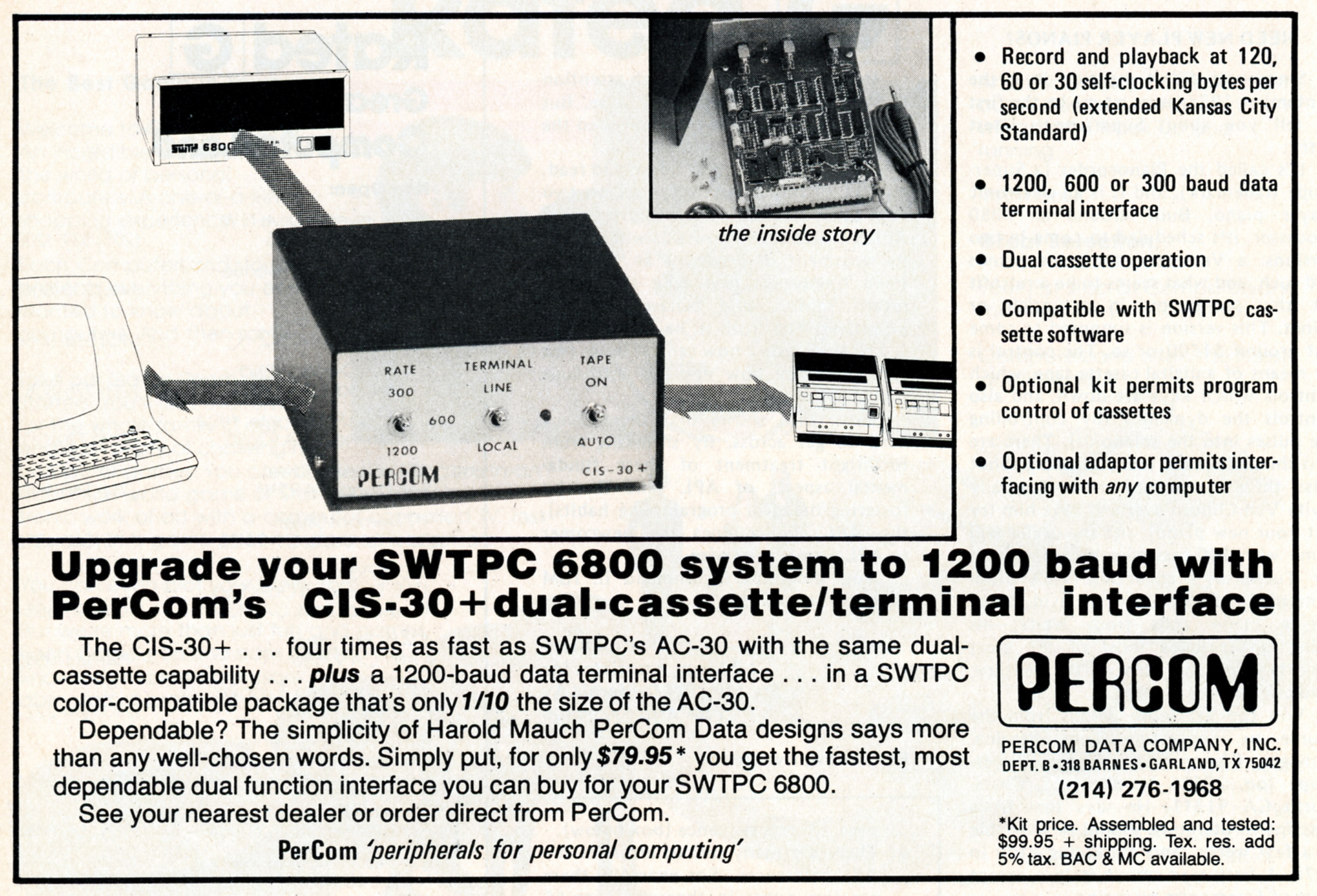
PerCom Data Company's cassette tape interface

Percom started after the meeting that produced the Kansas City standard for storing data on cassette tapes. The final version of the standard was written in February 1976, co-authored by Lee Felsenstein and Harold Mauch. Mauch published an article on the technical aspects of the standard in the next month's Byte magazine, entitled "Digital Data on Cassette Recorders".

Mauch and his wife Lucy started what was originally PerCom Data that same month, selling the CIS-30 adaptor allowing any portable cassette player to be connected to the Motorola 6800-based micros from SWTPC. The CIS-30 was a success, and soon followed by similar devices for other platforms. Floppy disk drives followed, along with rapid growth. Percom incorporated (dropping the capital C in the name) in 1978.

In 1979, the company branched out into the TRS-80 market, starting with the Percom Separator, and add-on device that corrected deficiencies in Radio Shack's own floppy disk interface. In 1980 they introduced the Percom Doubler, the first double-density floppy disk for the TRS-80 platform. They later introduced Electric Crayon, a color graphics system that communicated with the TRS-80 through the printer port and output to a separate composite monitor or color television. In 1981 they moved all operations to Dallas, Texas except technical services and repair which stayed in Garland, Texas.

Percom introduced a drive for the Atari 8-bit computers in 1982. In contrast to the Atari 810, the only drive on the platform at that time, the RFD40 drive offered double-density formatting and higher performance. Its onboard controller also allowed three additional "dumb" drives, lacking the controller, to be connected and thereby lowering the cost of a multi-drive system. A drive with the controller cost $799, additional drives were $399. The standard 34-pin connector also allowed for the use of 8-inch drives on the same controller. The system did not ship with a compatible DOS, instead, it shipped with a utility that modified an existing copy of Atari DOS to add double-density support. The 1983 AT-88 model was a single-density version otherwise the same as the RFD40.

Harold died suddenly in August 1982 and the company began to focus on the business market. This resulted in the creation of the Visionnet, an early Ethernet card for the IBM PC. Western Digital licensed the design and sold it under the name Ethercard Plus.

== After Mauch ==
Harold Mauch's sudden death in August 1982 upset the company considerably. Focussing on business products, leaving the home computer field, the company started branching out into new product lines. PerComNet for the IBM PC was licensed by Western Digital and was sold under the name PC-LAN.

In 1984, Esprit Systems purchased Percom and folded many of their product lines. Esprit made video terminal systems; the company folded around 2003.
