= Tarbell Cassette Interface =

Expansion card

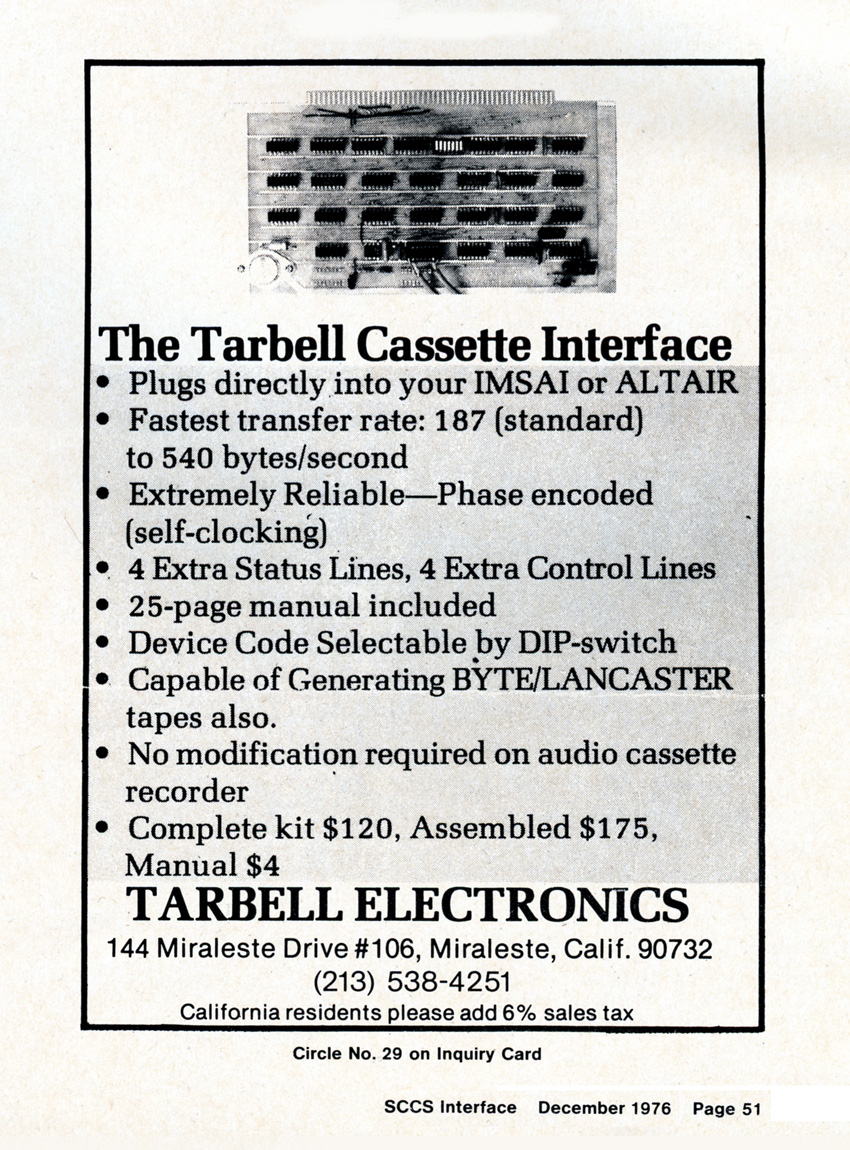
The Tarbell Cassette Interface was advertised in 1976.

The Tarbell Cassette Interface is an expansion card for use with the Altair 8800 early personal computer, or other systems using the Altair's S-100 bus. It was designed by Don Tarbell and sold by Tarbell Electronics starting in 1976. At the time, it was considered to be fast, reliable, and popular, and became a de facto standard for compact cassette data storage.

The Tarbell format is essentially Manchester encoding where a "1" bit in the original data is output as "01", and a "0" bit is output as "10". This is accomplished by reading a byte into a shift register which is periodically triggered by a 555 timer. Although the system can be run at any audible frequency, it is normally set to 3,000 Hz. As each data bit requires two output bits, the effective data rate is 1,500 bits per second, or 187 bytes per second. On reading, the system uses clock recovery to calculate the original data rate to account for tape stretch and other effects. This means the data can be recorded at any hardware-supported rate, and the manual suggests up to 560 bytes per second.

At the time of its release in 1976, the 300 bits per second Kansas City standard was also in use. Tarbell later modified the system to support these tapes. This increases the main oscillator from its normal 3,000 Hz to 4,800 Hz, and then writes either 00000000 (on tape, "1010" ×4) to produce a single "1", or 01010101 ("0110" ×4) to produce a "0". Because the system divides the basic rate by two, and each bit requires eight outputs, this produces the standard 300 bits per second output of the Kansas City standard.

Tarbell also sold other products, including TARBELL CASSETTE BASIC in 1978 and a Shugart Associates-compatible dual disk drive subsystem. The latter includes a Tarbell floppy disk interface, said to plug into any S-100 bus computer, introduced in 1979.
