= Samsung SGH-M310 =

Cellular phone

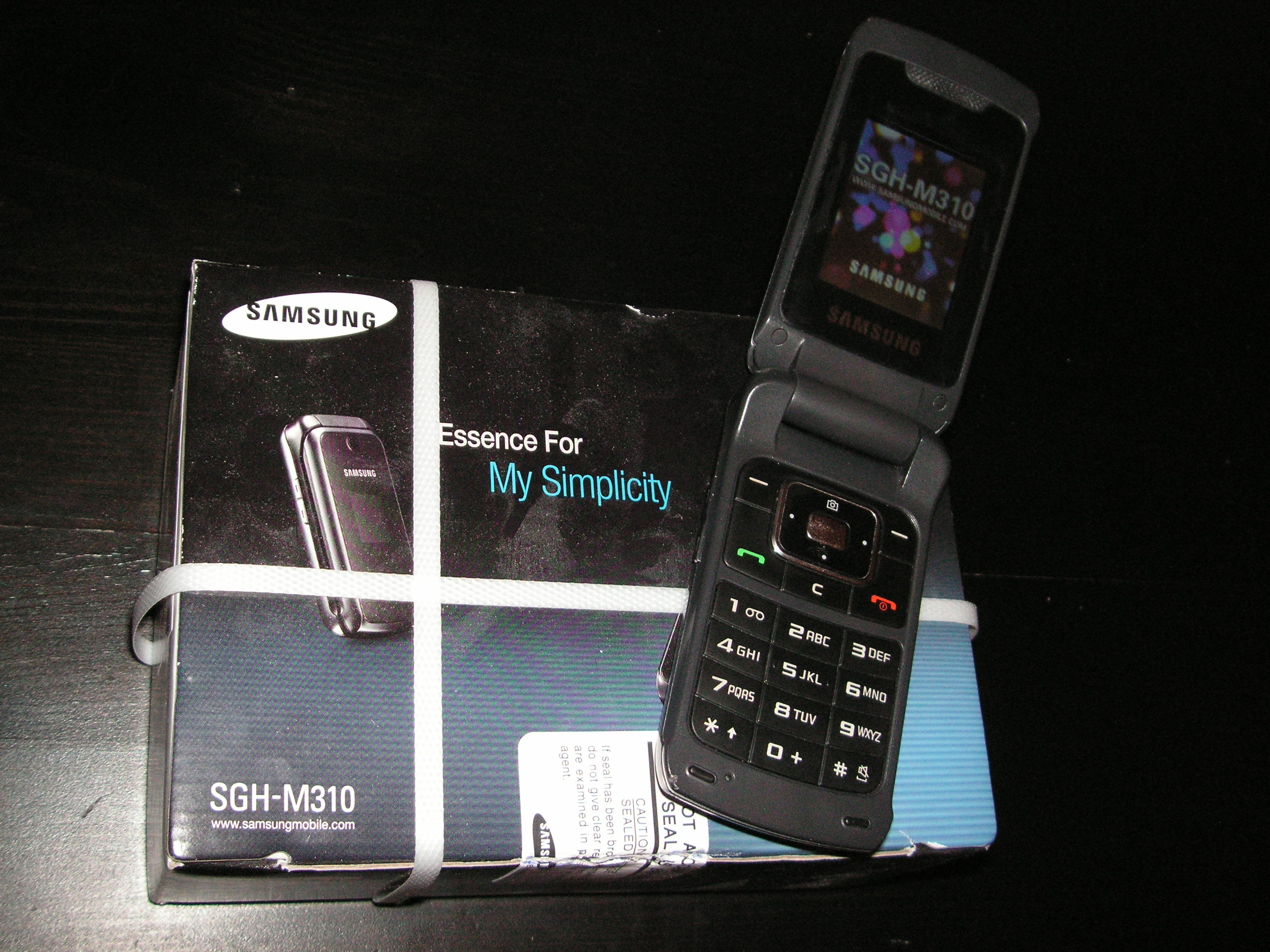
- Manufacturer: Samsung Electronics
- Availability by region: 2008
- Compatible networks: GSM 850/900/1800/1900
- Form factor: Clamshell
- Dimensions: 87 x 45 x 19,4 mm
- Weight: (87 g)
- Memory: 4 MB embedded
- Battery: 4 hour Lithium ion
- Rear camera: 0.3 Megapixel
- Display: 128 X 160 px CSTN
- Connectivity: Bluetooth 2.0, USB

The Samsung SGH-M310 is a cellular phone manufactured by Samsung.

It was marketed as cheap with elegant shapes.

The SGH-M310 mobile phone comes with FM radio, a VGA camera, and a MP3 decoder.

The phone was mainly released in Europe and Samsung only lists it in its German site.
