= HP-67/97 =

Calculator

HP-67, HP-97
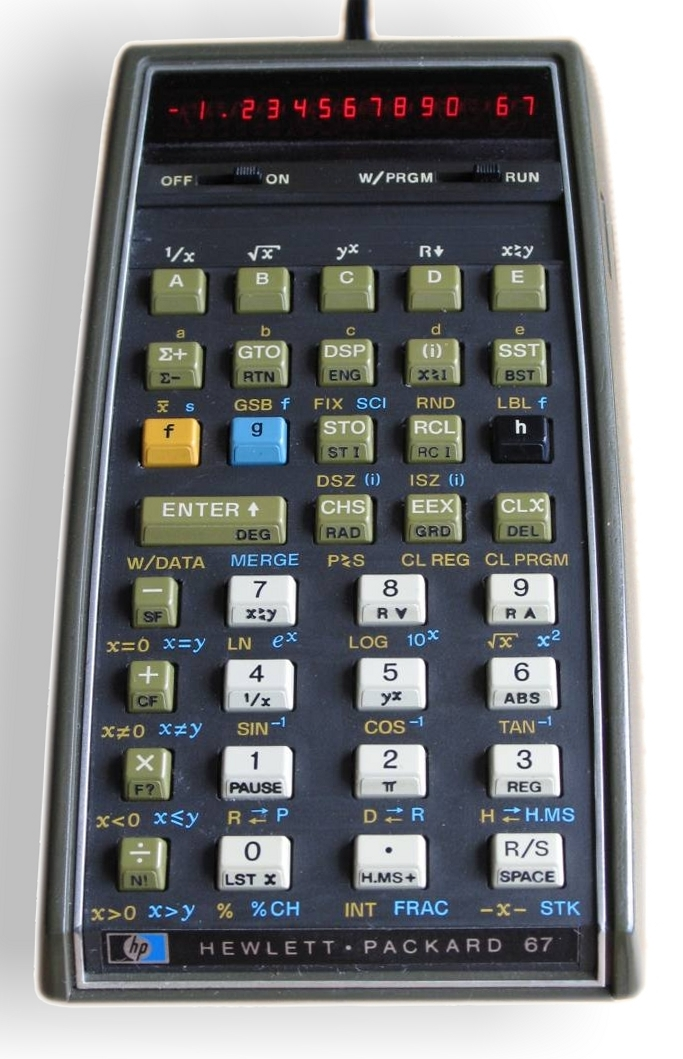
- HP-67
- Type: Programmable
- Introduced: 1976
- Discontinued: 1982 (HP-97: 1984)

Calculator
- Entry mode: RPN key stroke
- Display type: Red LED seven-segment display
- Display size: 15 digits (decimal point uses one digit), (±10^{±99})

CPU
- Processor: proprietary

Programming
- Programming language(s): key codes

Other
- Power supply: Internal rechargeable battery or 115/230 V AC, 5 W
- Weight: Calculator: 11 oz (310 g), recharger: 5 oz (140 g)
- Dimensions: Length: 6.0 inches (150 mm), width: 3.2 inches (81 mm), height: 0.7–1.4 inches (18–36 mm)

The HP-67 is a magnetic card-programmable handheld calculator, introduced by Hewlett-Packard in 1976 at an MSRP of $450. A desktop version with built-in thermal printer was sold as the HP-97 at a price of $750. Collectively, they are known as the HP-67/97.

Marketed as improved successors to the HP-65, the HP-67/97 were based on the technology of the "20-series" of calculators (HP-25, HP-19C etc.) introduced a year earlier. The two models are functionally equivalent, and programs on magnetic cards can be interchanged between them.

== Features ==
The 67/97 provide a complete set of scientific, statistical and engineering operations, including trigonometric, logarithmic and exponential functions, coordinate conversions, average/standard deviation etc.

The HP-67/97 series featured a program memory of 224 eight-bit words. The two extra bits per word compared to the HP-65's six allowed the designers to store any program instruction in a single memory cell ("fully merged keycodes") even if it required multiple keystrokes to enter. Programs could include 20 labels, subroutines (3 levels deep), four flag registers, 8 comparison functions, and extended index and loop control functions.

At 15 digits, the display was wider than those of the predecessor models, although the decimal point was displayed on its own digit position. The HP-67 keys carry up to four functions each, accessed through "f", "g" and "h" prefix keys (gold, blue and black labels, respectively). The model 97 had more (and larger) keys, therefore only two functions were assigned to each key. When interchanging magnetic cards between the HP-67 and the HP-97, the calculators' software took care of converting the key codes, and emulated the 97's print functions through the 67's display.

The HP-67 is powered by a pack of three AA-sized nickel-cadmium rechargeable batteries. Owing to the power requirements of the built-in thermal printer, the HP-97 employs a larger battery pack and more powerful charger.

== Memory and programming ==
Of the 26-register data memory, the first ten ("primary registers") could be accessed directly, ten more as an alternate register set, and the remaining six through the user defined keys A-E and as an index register. Using the latter, a program could access all 26 registers as a single indexed array. Data memory is not permanent as in later models, i.e. register contents and program are lost when powering off. The alternate register set was also used by statistical functions.

The built-in magnetic card reader/writer could be used to save programs and data, with the ability to combine data from multiple cards. The same magnetic card format was later used for the HP-41C which offered compatibility to the 67/97 through software in the card reader. HP offered a library of programs supplied on packs of pre-recorded magnetic cards for many applications including surveying, medicine, as well as civil and electrical engineering. Cards could be write protected by cutting off a designated corner.

In addition to software and support from HP, an active user community supported the HP-67/97 as well as the other HP programmables of the era. The group was called PPC and produced the PPC Journal. One of the notable contributions of the group was the development of a "Blackbox" that allowed pseudo-alphanumeric displays.

A version adapted to support an additional backward-facing display manufactured by Educational Calculator Devices named EduCALC 67 GD existed as well.

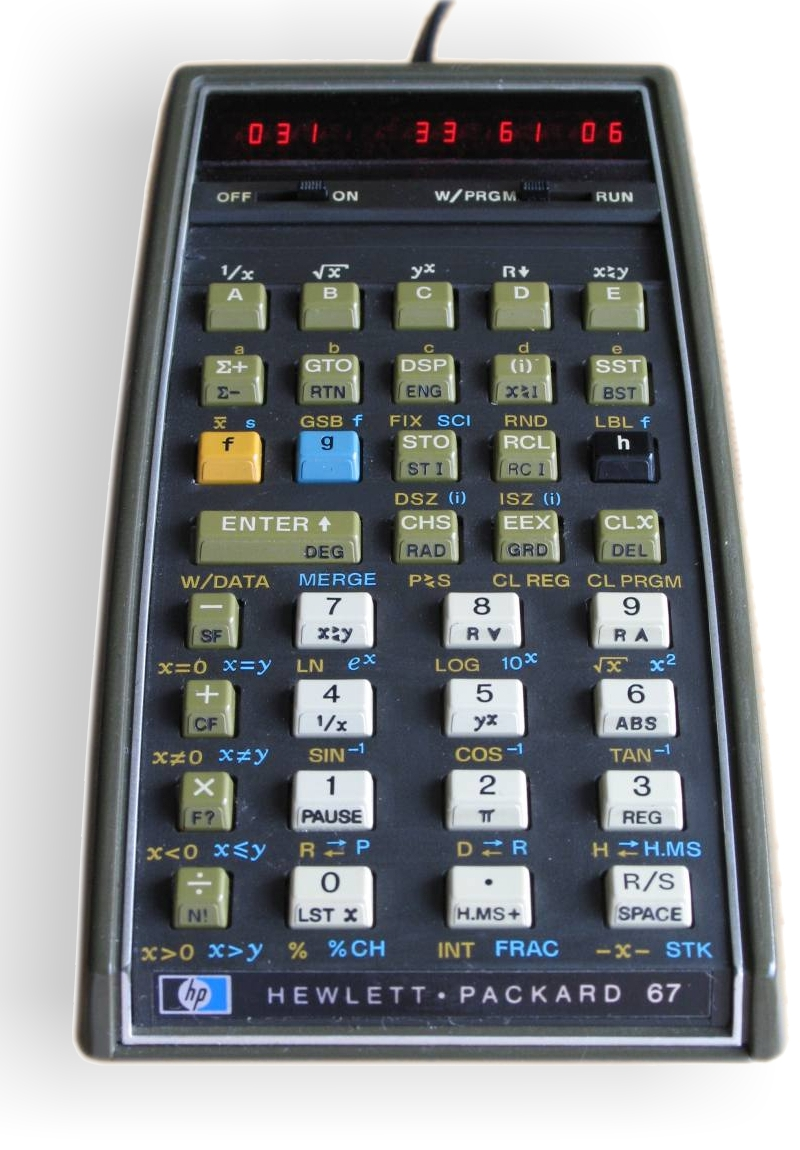
HP-67 in programming mode showing the key code for STO + 6

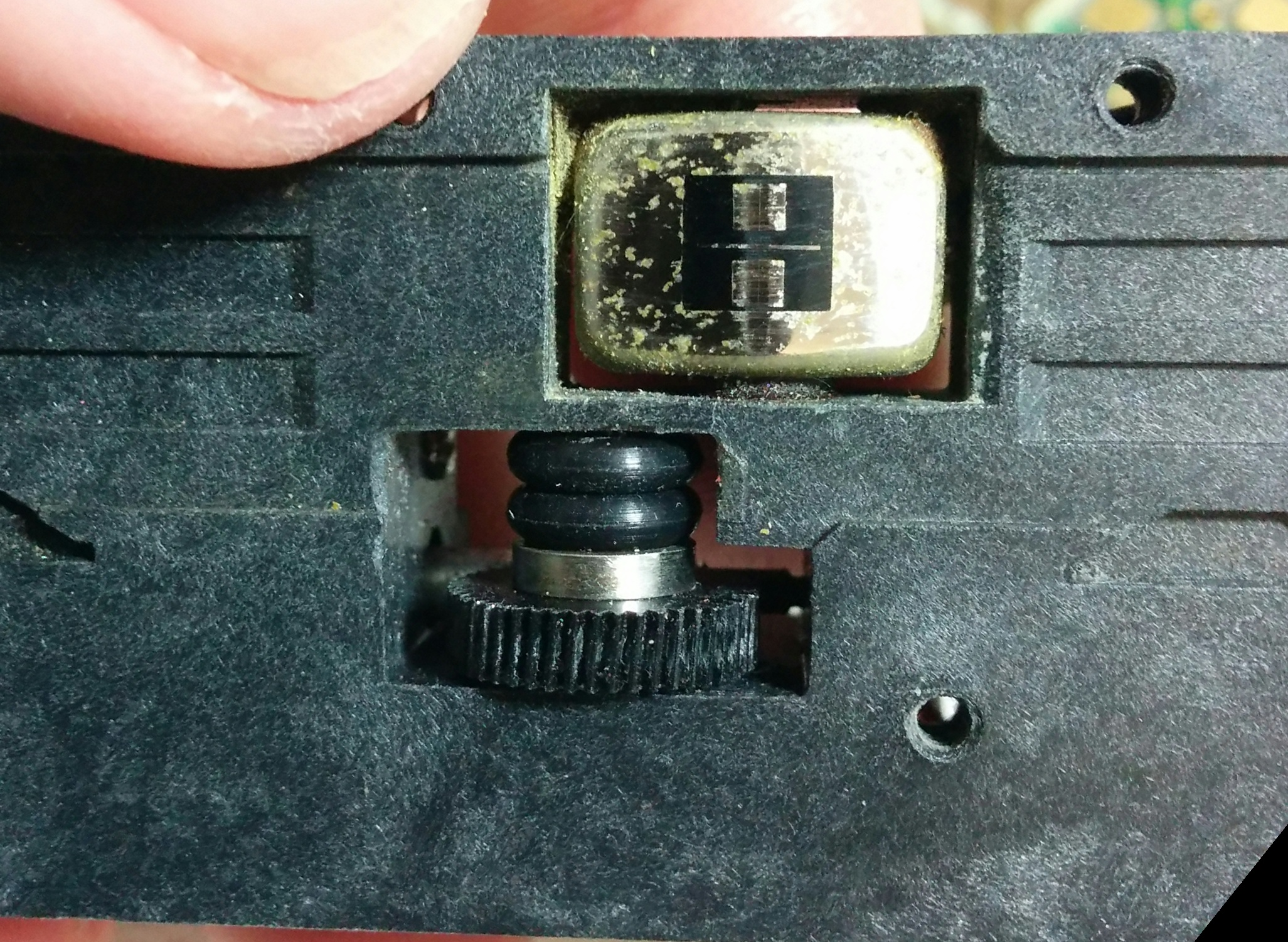
The magnetic reading head (top) of the HP-67 and a part of the transport mechanism (rubber rollers and cogwheel) of the integrated reader for magnetic cards

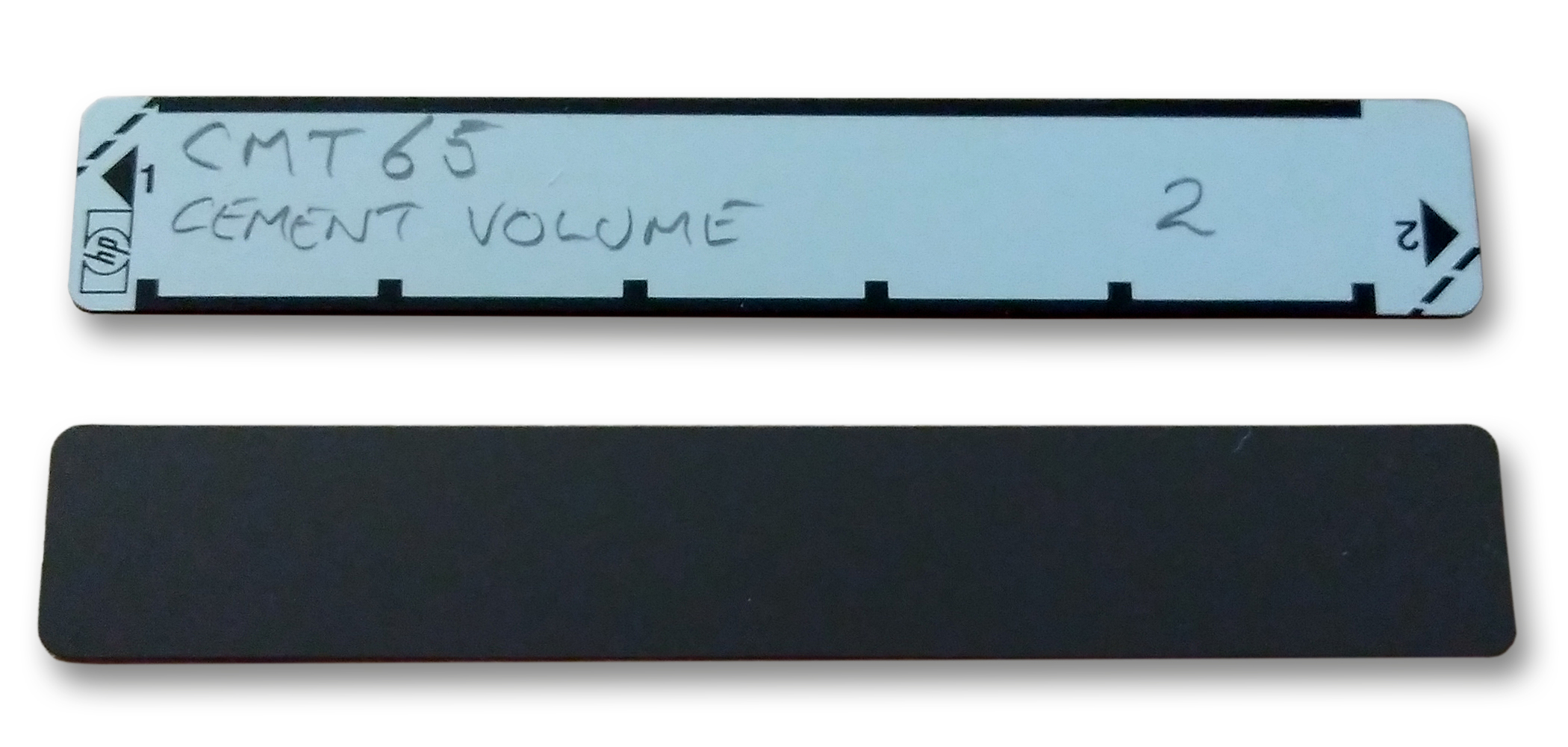
HP magnetic card

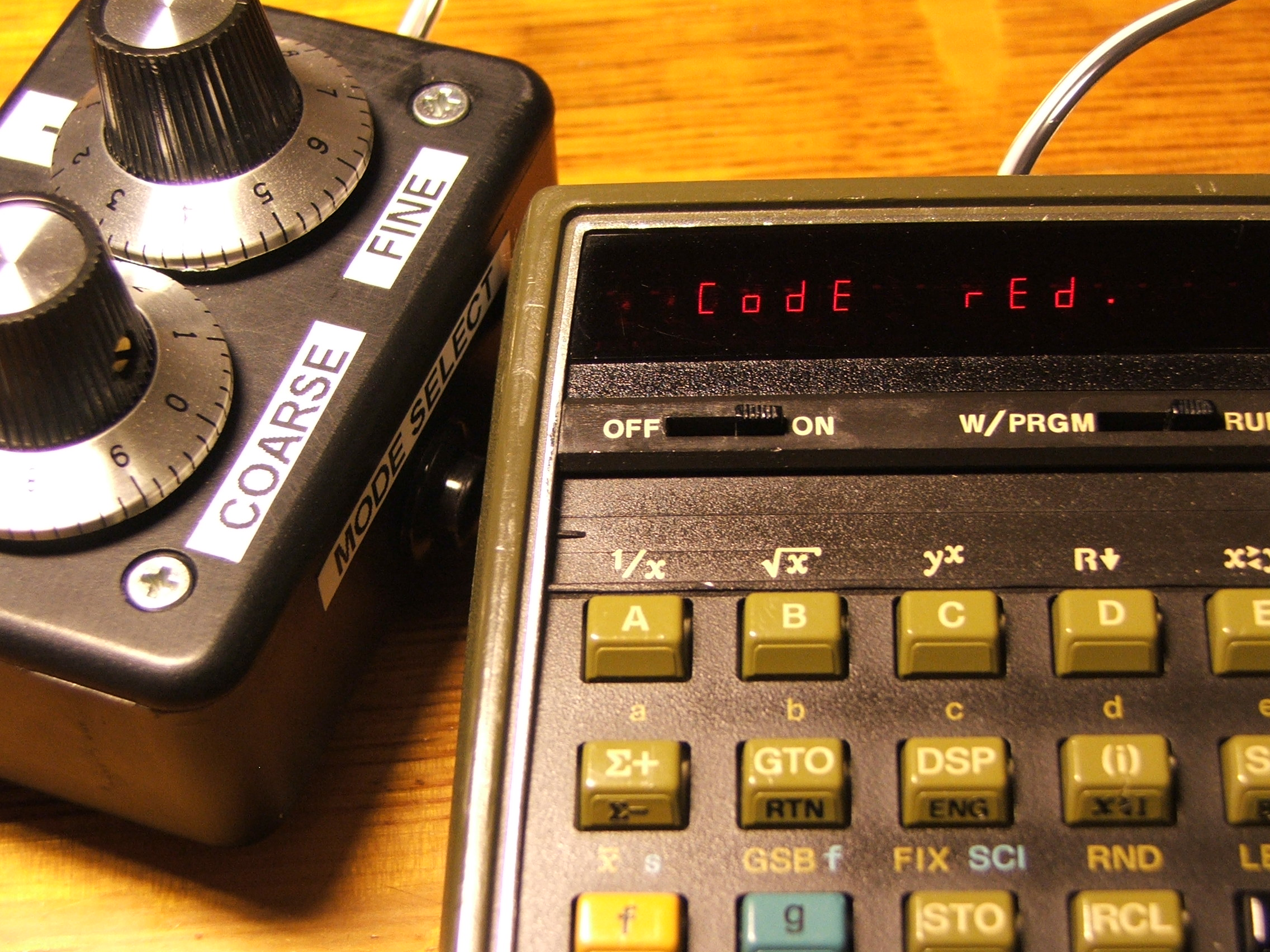
HP-67 with Blackbox in action

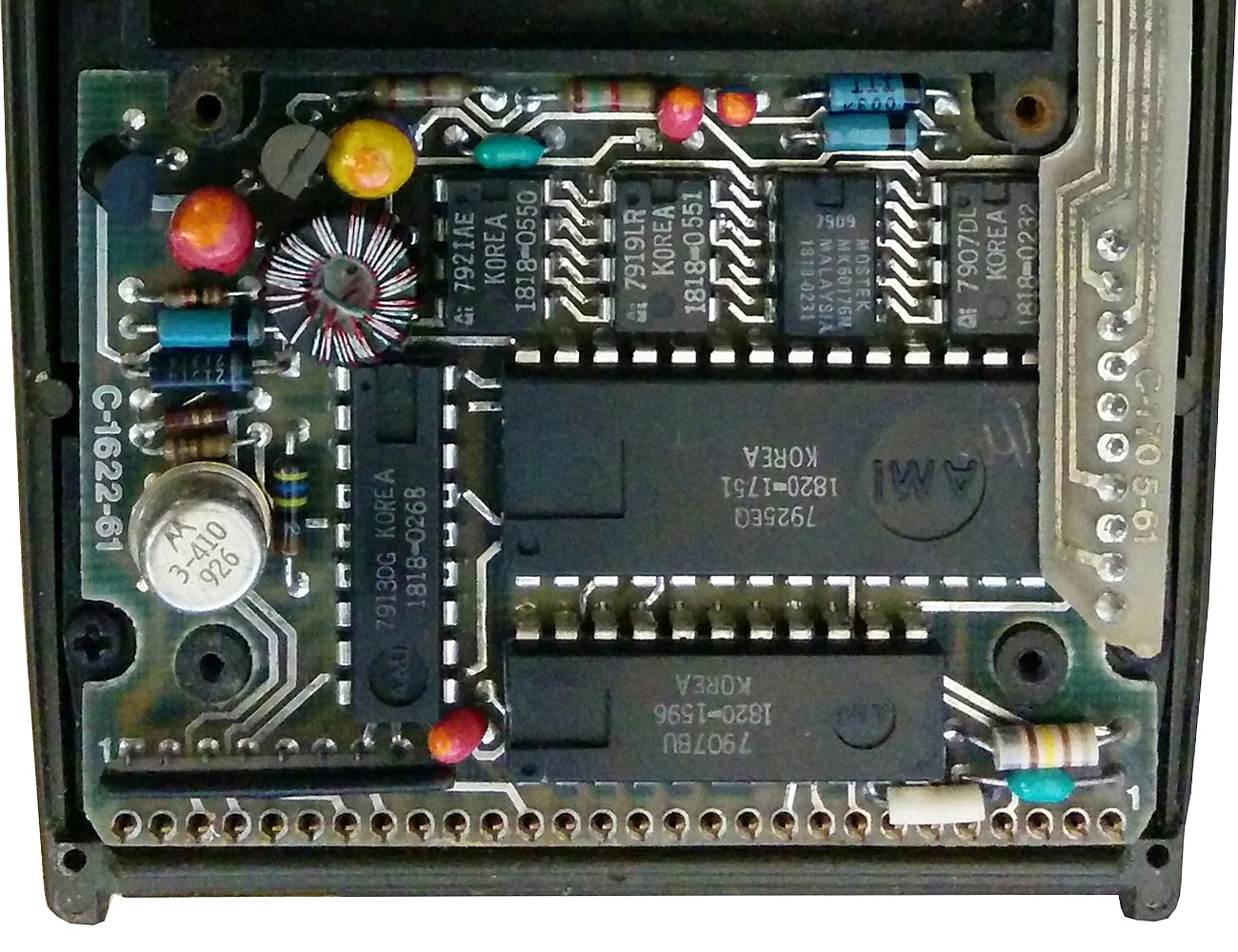
The mainboard of the HP-67, taking up only about one-third of the length of the device

== HP-97S ==
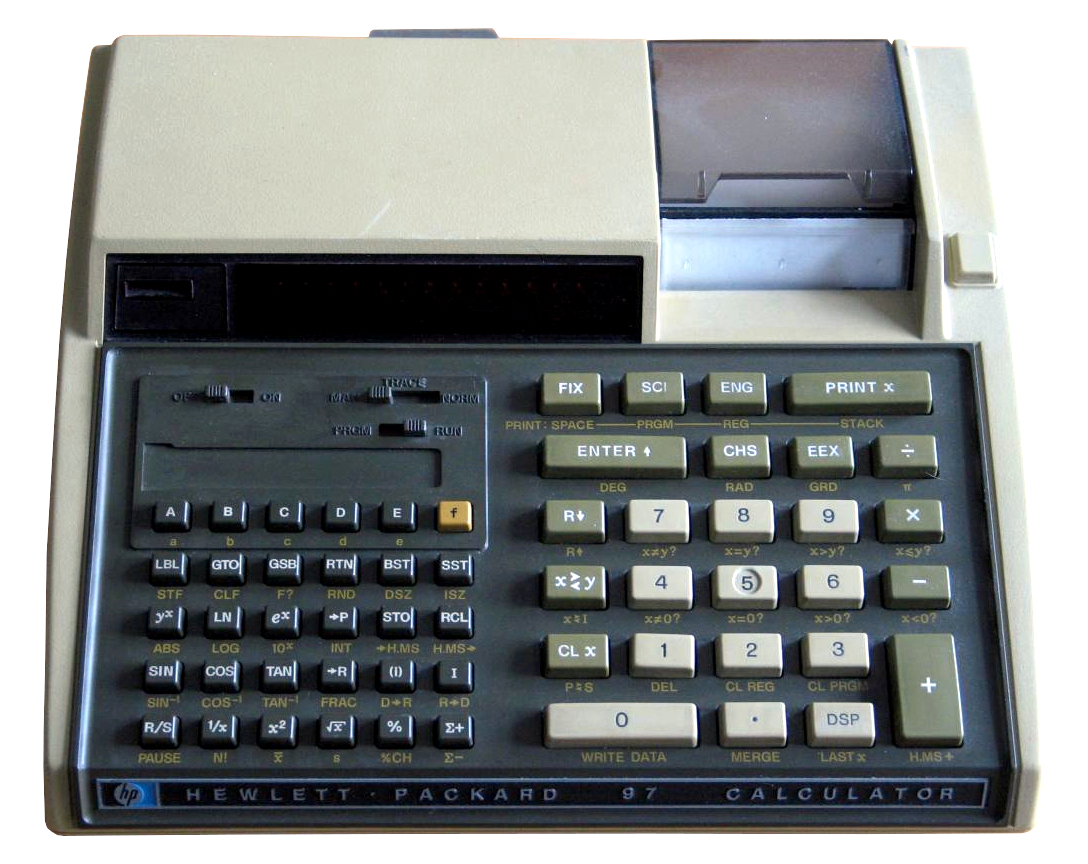
HP-97 calculator

In 1977, HP introduced an extended version of the desktop model as the HP-97S which featured an extra parallel I/O port (40 lines for 10 4-bit BCD digits, plus 5 control lines) for collecting data from external hardware, at a price of $1,375.

== See also ==
- HP-25
- TI-59 (competitor model)
