= HP-25 =

1975–1978 calculator by Hewlett-Packard

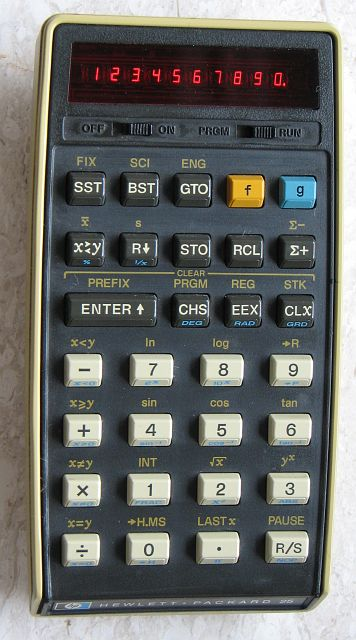

Calculator
- Entry mode: RPN
- Display size: 10-digit red LED

The HP-25 was a hand-held programmable scientific/engineering calculator made by Hewlett-Packard between early January 1975 and 1978. The HP-25 was introduced as a cheaper (US$195 MSRP) alternative to the ground-breaking HP-65. It was smaller than the HP-65 with fewer (10 v. 15) digits in the display. (Also introduced in 1975, the HP-55 was a lower-cost alternative to the HP-65, but with the same size and display.)

To reduce cost, the HP-25 omitted the HP-65's magnetic card reader, so it could only be programmed using the keyboard. After switching off, the program was lost and had to be typed in again. The model HP-25C, introduced in 1976, addressed that shortcoming through the first use of battery-backed CMOS memory in a calculator, termed continuous memory by HP.

Like all early HP calculators, the 25 used the Reverse Polish Notation (RPN) for entering calculations, working on a four-level stack (x,y,z,t). Nearly all buttons had two alternative functions, accessed by a blue and yellow prefix key. A small sliding switch was used to change between "run" and "program" mode. The HP-25 used a 10-digit red LED display and was the first calculator to introduce the "engineering" display option, a denormalized mantissa/exponent format where the exponent is always a multiple of 3 to match the common SI prefixes, e.g. mega, kilo, milli, micro, nano.

The HP-25 had memory space for up to 49 program steps. It was the first HP calculator which used fully merged keycodes (storing prefix key and function key together in one program location) to save memory space. Additionally there were eight storage registers and specialized scientific and statistical functions. The owner's manual came with 161 pages in four colors and contained many mathematical, scientific, navigational and financial programming examples.

The HP-25 was about 25% smaller than the HP-65. It used the same trapezoid profiled keys introduced with the HP-65. The HP-25 was regarded as a competitor to the TI-58 and TI-58C calculators offered by Texas Instruments. Looking strictly at the functionality and capacity, the more equal competitor would be the TI-57. It lacked a few of the HP-25's functions, but had some other advantages.

One notable deficiency of the HP-25/25C was the lack of a subroutine capability, at a time when the TI-58 and even the earlier SR-56 had subroutines. Although 49 fully merged keycodes were roughly equivalent to the unmerged 100 steps of the SR-56; by the time the TI-58 arrived with 480 steps, subroutines, DSZ loops, etc., the HP-25/25C had serious competition. HP went on to introduce the HP-29C/19C calculators with 99 merged steps, labels, and subroutines. And TI introduced a TI-58C with continuous memory.

A version adapted to support an additional backward-facing display manufactured by Educational Calculator Devices named EduCALC 25 GD existed as well.

== See also ==
- HP calculators
- List of Hewlett-Packard products: Pocket calculators

== Notes ==
1. US$195 in 1975 ≈ US$770 in 2009 (see The Inflation Calculator)
