= TI-57 =

Programmable calculator produced by Texas Instruments

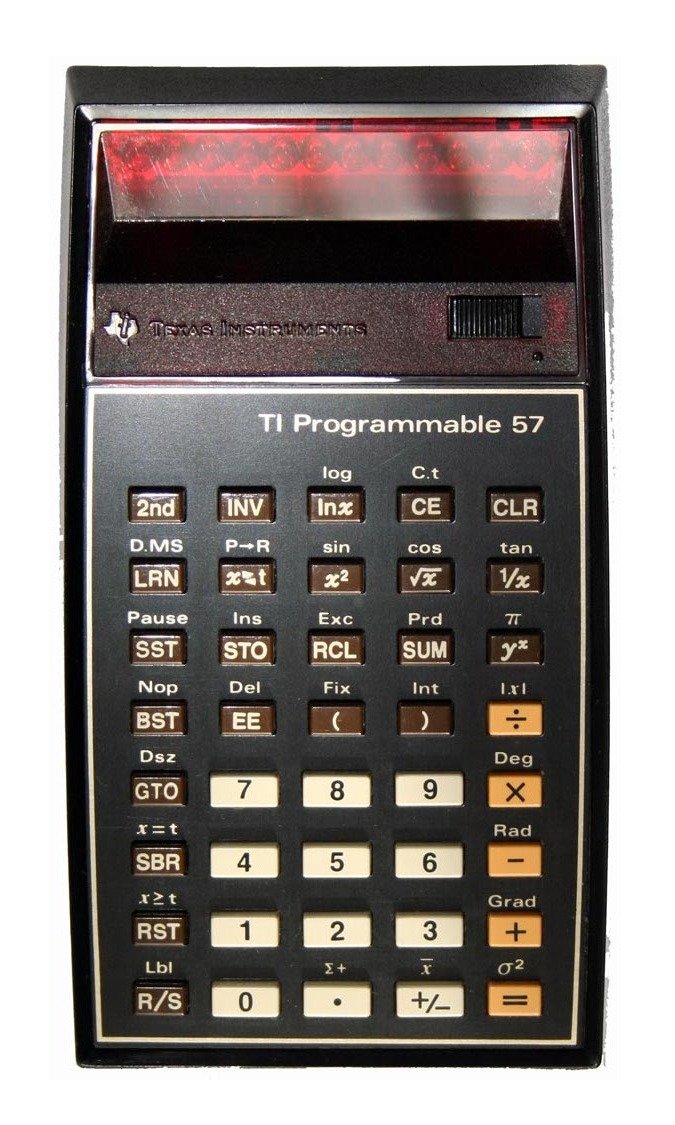
TI-57 with LED display

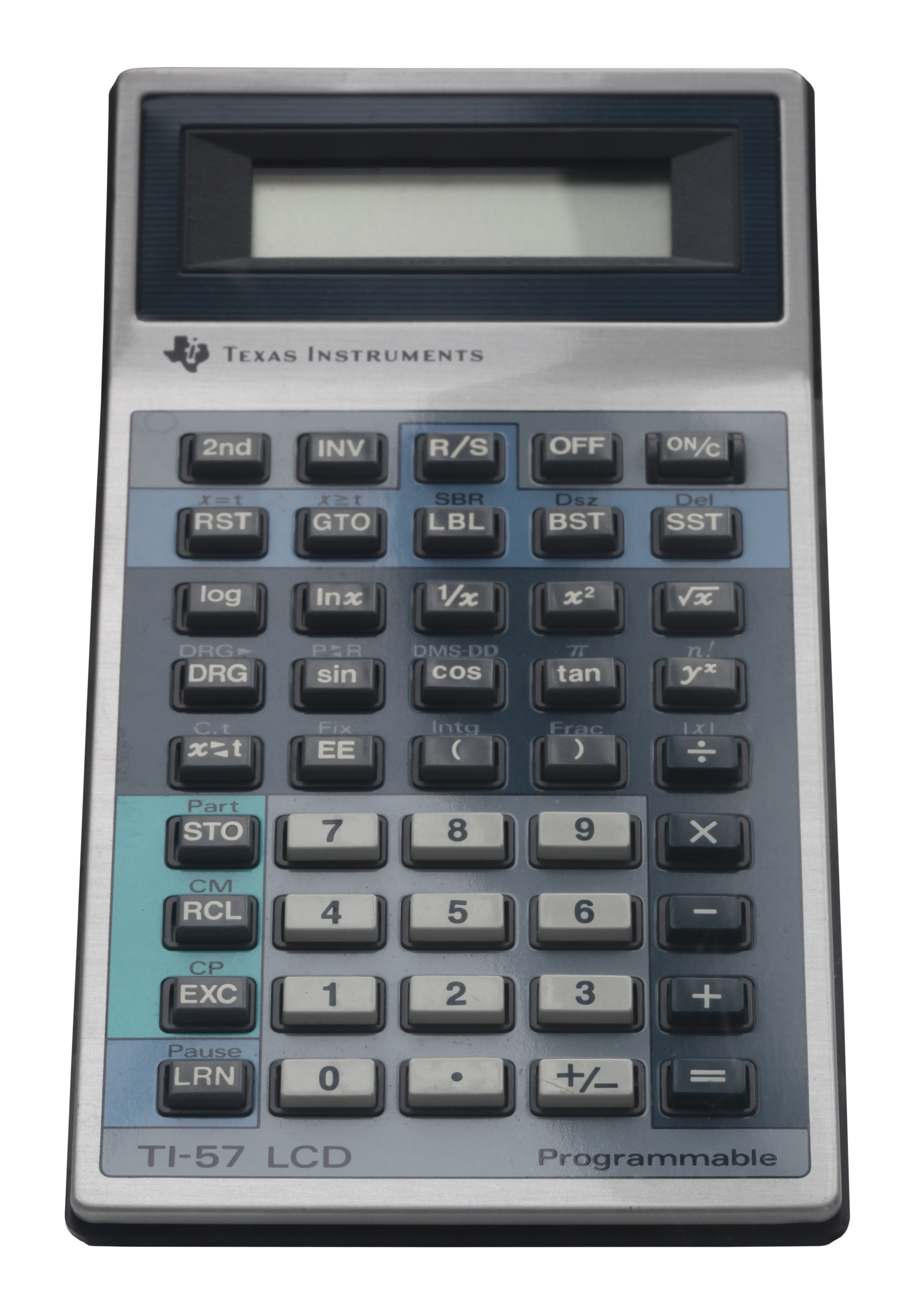
TI-57 with LCD technology for display

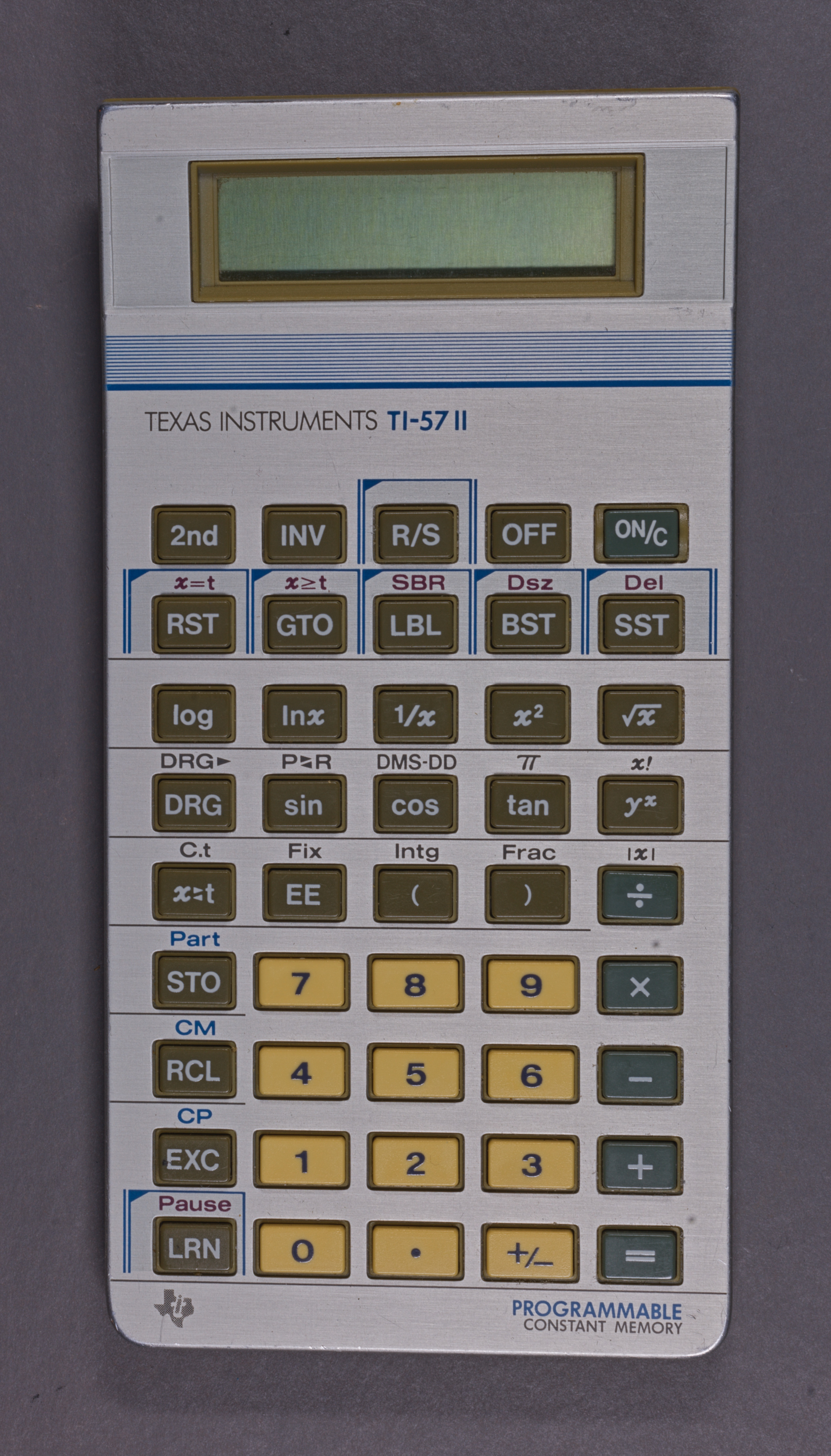
TI-57-II (LCD)

The TI-57 is a discontinued product line of programmable calculators made by Texas Instruments between 1977 and 1982. There are three devices by this name made by TI. The first TI-57 devices with LED displays were released in September 1977 along the more powerful TI-58 and TI-59. The original devices have 50 program steps and eight memory registers. Two later versions named TI-57 LCD and TI-57 LCD-II have LCDs, but are less powerful (run much slower) and have much less memory: 48 bytes to be allocated between program 'steps' and storage registers.

The TI-57 lacks non-volatile memory, so any programs entered are lost when the calculator is switched off or the battery runs out.

The LED display version of the TI-57 was sold with a rechargeable nickel–cadmium battery pack BP7 containing two AA size batteries and electronics to raise the voltage to the 9V required by the calculator. A popular modification is to power it from a 9V battery and use the battery cover of a LED TI-30 or a part of the dismantled battery pack. This modification provides a better battery life than the original battery pack.

Included, with at least the original version, was a book entitled Making Tracks Into Programming. It is subtitled "A step-by-step learning guide to the power, ease and fun of using your TI Programmable 57".

Radio Shack also marketed this calculator, rebranded as the EC-4000.

== Programming ==
The programming capabilities of the TI-57 are similar to a primitive macro assembler. Any keystroke can be stored, along with some simple program flow control commands and conditional tests. These include:

GTO (GoTO): Causes program pointer to jump immediately to a Label (0-9) or to a specific program step (00 to 49).

SBR (SuBRoutine): Causes a program to jump to a Label, and on encountering an Inv SBR command, continue executing at the instruction immediately following the original SBR.

DSZ (Decrement and Skip on Zero): Decrements storage register zero, and skips the next instruction if the result is zero. There was also an inverse form, Decrement and Skip if Not Zero.

Tests for equality/inequality can be performed against a value on the display (the x register) and a dedicated test register, t. The result of the test causes the next instruction to be conditionally skipped.

Programs can be edited by inserting, deleting, or overwriting a program step. A NOP (No OPeration) function is provided to allow a program step to be ignored. Due to the hard limit of 50 program steps, use of NOP is infrequent. The TI-57 uses the "one step, one instruction" principle, regardless of whether one instruction required one or up to four keypresses.

== Sample program ==
The following program generates pseudo-random numbers within the range of 1 to 6.

Step	Code	Key(s)	Function	Comment
00	30	2nd y^{x}	π	Pi
01	75	+	+	
02	33 0	RCL 0	RCL 0	Recall register 0
03	85		=	
04	35	y^{x}	y^{x}	
05	08	8	8	
06	65	−	−	
07	49	2nd )	Int	Integer function
08	85		=	
09	32 0	STO 0	STO 0	Store result in register 0
10	55	x	x	
11	06	6	6	Upper bound of the random number
12	75	+	+	
13	01	1	1	
14	85		=	
15	49	2nd )	Int	Integer function
16	81	R/S	R/S	Stop (Pause)
17	71	RST	RST	Reset (back to step 00)
