= NumWorks =

Technology company

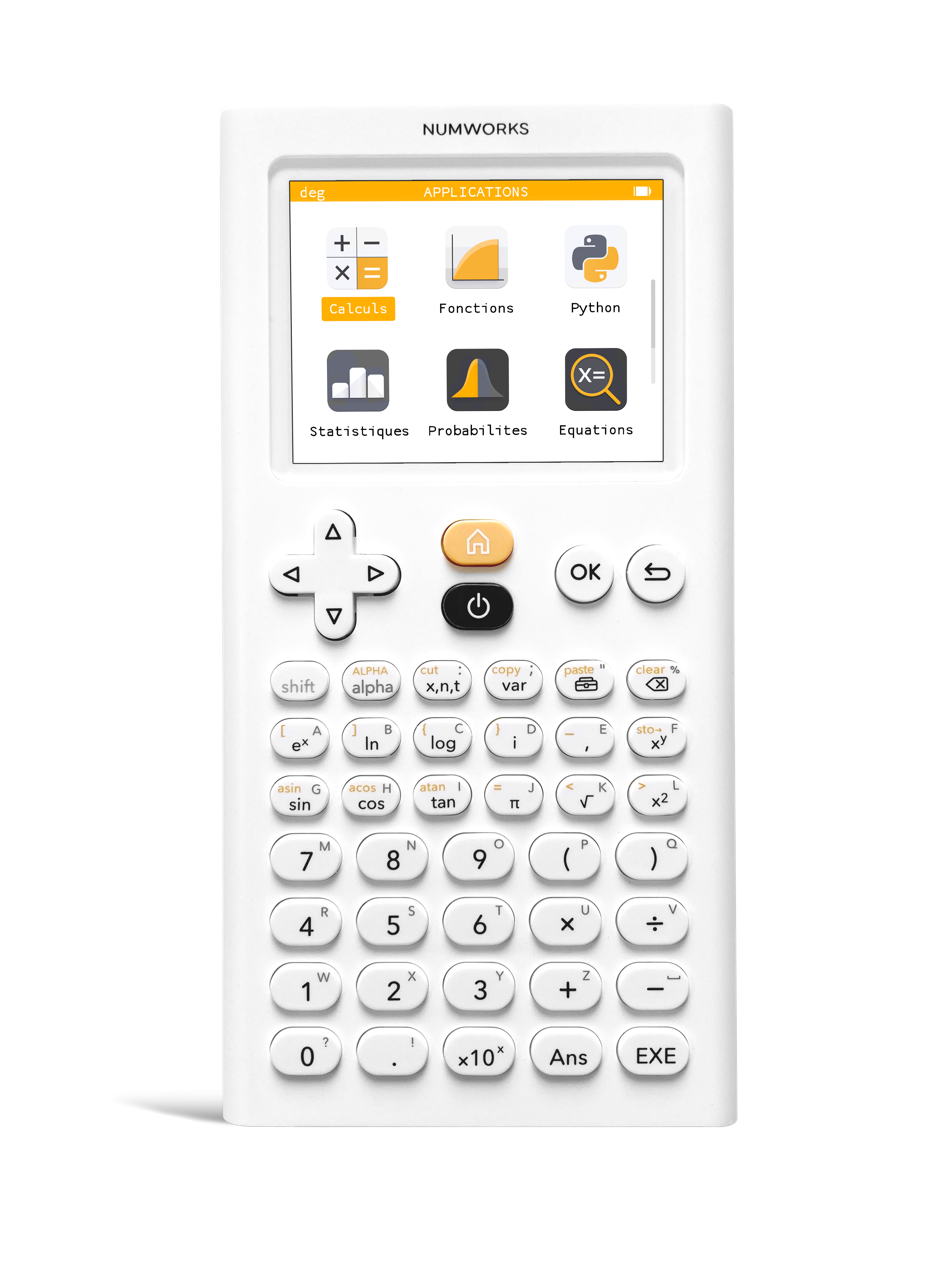
- Type: Private
- Industry: Education
- Founded: March 4, 2016; 10 years ago
- Founder: Romain Goyet
- Products: Graphing Calculators
- Website: www.numworks.com

NumWorks is a French technology company that designs, develops, and sells graphing calculators. Their calculators are source-available and have their hardware design available under a Creative Commons license. Its first calculator, the N0100, was released on August 29, 2017, in Europe and the United States and is geared towards high school classrooms and students. The calculators use Python as their programming language, rather than a proprietary language (e.g. TI-BASIC, which is used by Texas Instruments calculators).

== Development ==
Romain Goyet, the CEO of NumWorks, started the company in 2016. Before starting NumWorks, he was a software engineer at Apple who also contributed to open-source projects such as Linux.

== Products ==
The NumWorks graphing calculator was the first graphing calculator to be programmable using the Python language. It features a 320x240 IPS display with a 2.8″ diagonal. Internally, it is powered by a 216 MHz Cortex-M7 processor and 8 MB of Quad-SPI Flash memory. The calculator has a 1450 mAh lithium polymer battery. The calculator weights 5.9 oz (0.37 lb) and measures 8.2 cm × 16 cm × 1 cm (3.23 in × 6.30 in × 0.39 in).

Four versions of the calculator were produced by NumWorks: the N0100, N0110, N0120, and N0115 models. Technical limitations of the N0100 model's memory prevent any upgrade to an OS version higher than 19.5.17.

Model	N0100	N0110	N0115	N0120
Processor	STM32F412; Cortex-M4; 100 MHz	STM32F730; Cortex-M7; 216 MHz		STM32H725; Cortex-M7; 550 MHz
Display	320 x 240 pixels, 140 PPI; 65 536 colors (16 bits)			
Interpreter	MicroPython 1.17.0 (compatible with Python 3.4)			
RAM	256 KB			564 KB
Flash ROM	1 MB	8 MB + 64 KB		8MB + 512 KB
Python scripts storage	32 KB			
Launch - Discontinuation	2017 - 2019	2019 - 2023	2023 - ---	2022 - ---
Connector	Micro USB Type-B		USB Type-C	
Battery	1820 mAh	1450 mAh		

== Features ==
The calculator was specifically designed to be modded using 3D printing. 3D models, schematics, and board layout details are available to the public under a Creative Commons license. The software on the calculator is updated on a monthly cycle. Updates can be downloaded to the calculator from its website using WebUSB or by building the operating system from its direct source.

The NumWorks calculator also includes various "exam modes" which may disable certain features (e.g. the periodic table app, Python scripts, etc.) in accordance with regional exam regulations. Exam mode can be disabled by plugging the calculator into a power source and selecting disable on the popup that appears.

On March 22, 2019, NumWorks released an app for iOS and Android, free of charge. It features the same functionality as the physical calculator, except it does not have data persistence.
