= STN display =

Type of LCD

An STN (super-twisted nematic) display is a type of liquid-crystal display (LCD). An LCD is a flat-panel display that uses liquid crystals to change its properties when exposed to an electric field, which can be used to create images. This change is called the twisted nematic (TN) field effect. Earlier TN displays twisted the liquid crystal molecules at a 90-degree angle. STN displays improved on that by twisting the liquid crystal molecules at a much greater angle, typically between 180 and 270 degrees. This allows for a sharper image and passive matrix addressing, a simpler way to control the pixels in an LCD.

While STN displays were once common in various electronic devices, they have been largely replaced by TFT (thin-film transistor) displays.

== Development ==
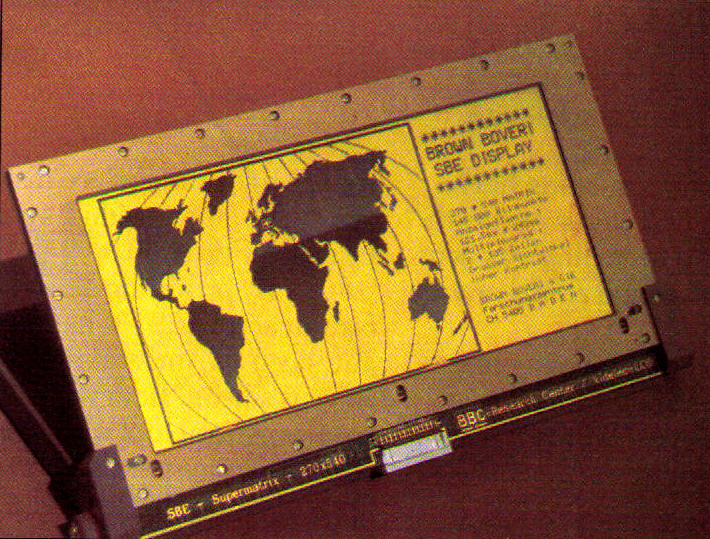
Early STN LCD built by Brown Boveri in 1984

In 1982, C. M. Waters and E. P. Raynes patented STN displays, and by 1984 researchers at Brown Boveri (later ABB) built the first prototype STN matrix display, with 540 × 270 pixels. A key challenge was finding a way to address more pixels efficiently. Standard TN displays weren't ideal for this because of their voltage characteristics. STN displays, with their 180–270 degree twist, offered a solution. This twist allows for a clearer distinction between on and off states, making them suitable for passive-matrix addressing with more pixels.

The main advantage of STN LCDs is their lower power consumption and affordability. They can also be made purely reflective for sunlight readability. In the late 1980s, they were used in portable computers and handheld devices like the Nintendo Game Boy. While still found in some simple digital products like calculators, STN displays have largely been replaced by TFT LCDs, which offer superior image quality and faster response times.

== Variants ==
CSTN in a Nokia 3510i phone

=== CSTN ===
CSTN (color super-twist nematic) is a color variant of STN displays, developed by Sharp. It uses red, green, and blue filters to create color images. Early CSTN displays had limitations like slow response times and ghosting. However, advancements have improved response times to 100 ms (still longer than the 8 ms for TFT), widened viewing angles to 140 degrees, and enhanced color quality, making them a more competitive option at about half the cost of TFT displays. A newer passive-matrix technology, high-performance addressing (HPA), offers even better performance than CSTN.

=== CCSTN ===
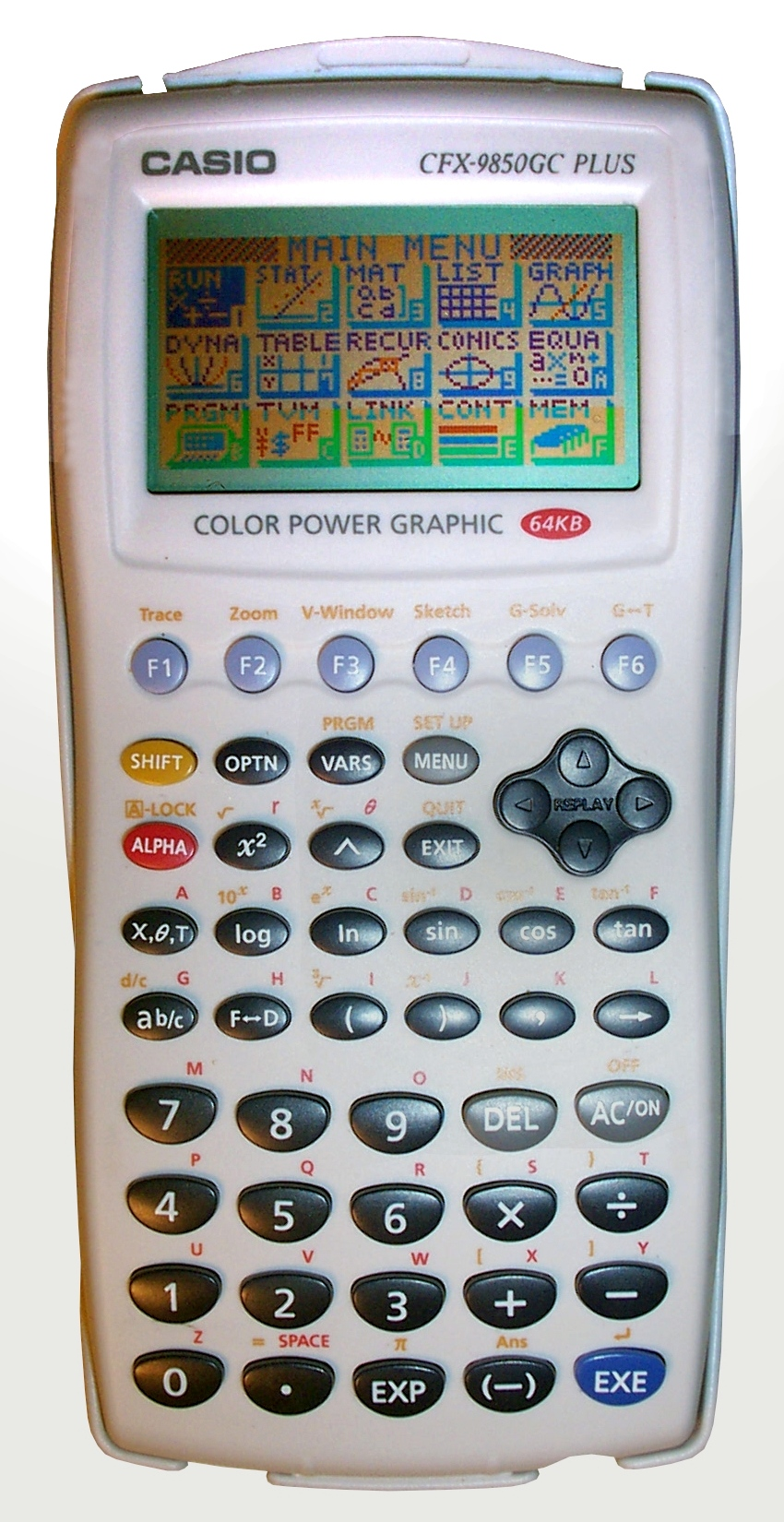
CCSTN on a Casio CFX-9850GC Plus graphing calculator

CCSTN (color coded STN) is another color variant of STN, which uses a type of liquid crystal that polarizes different wavelengths of light differently and achieves color without the use of sub pixels or color filters. This is possible because it uses a chiral liquid crystal, similar to those used in mood rings, instead of a more traditional symmetric one. It works by tuning the polarization amount, which due to the unique crystal over traditional STN displays, is able to change the color. This effect is known as birefringence. Theoretically, it could be tuned for any wavelength, but most devices could only display red, green, and blue. Its usage of unique crystal properties instead of color filters improved its brightness and contrast over other color LCDs at the time.

=== Other STN technologies ===
Other STN display variations were introduced, attempting to improve image quality and response times. They include:

- Double layer STN: Uses an extra compensating layer to provide a sharper image.
- DSTN (double STN or dual-scan STN): The screen is divided into halves, and each half is scanned simultaneously, thereby doubling the number of lines refreshed per second and providing a sharper appearance. Widely used on early portable computers.
- FRSTN (fast-response STN)
- FSTN: (film compensated STN, formulated STN or filtered STN): Uses a film compensating layer between the STN display and rear polarizer for added sharpness and contrast. Used on early portable computers before adoption of DSTN.
- FFSTN (double film compensated STN)
- MSTN (monochrome STN)
