= HP-19C/-29C =

Pocket calculator produced by Hewlett-Packard

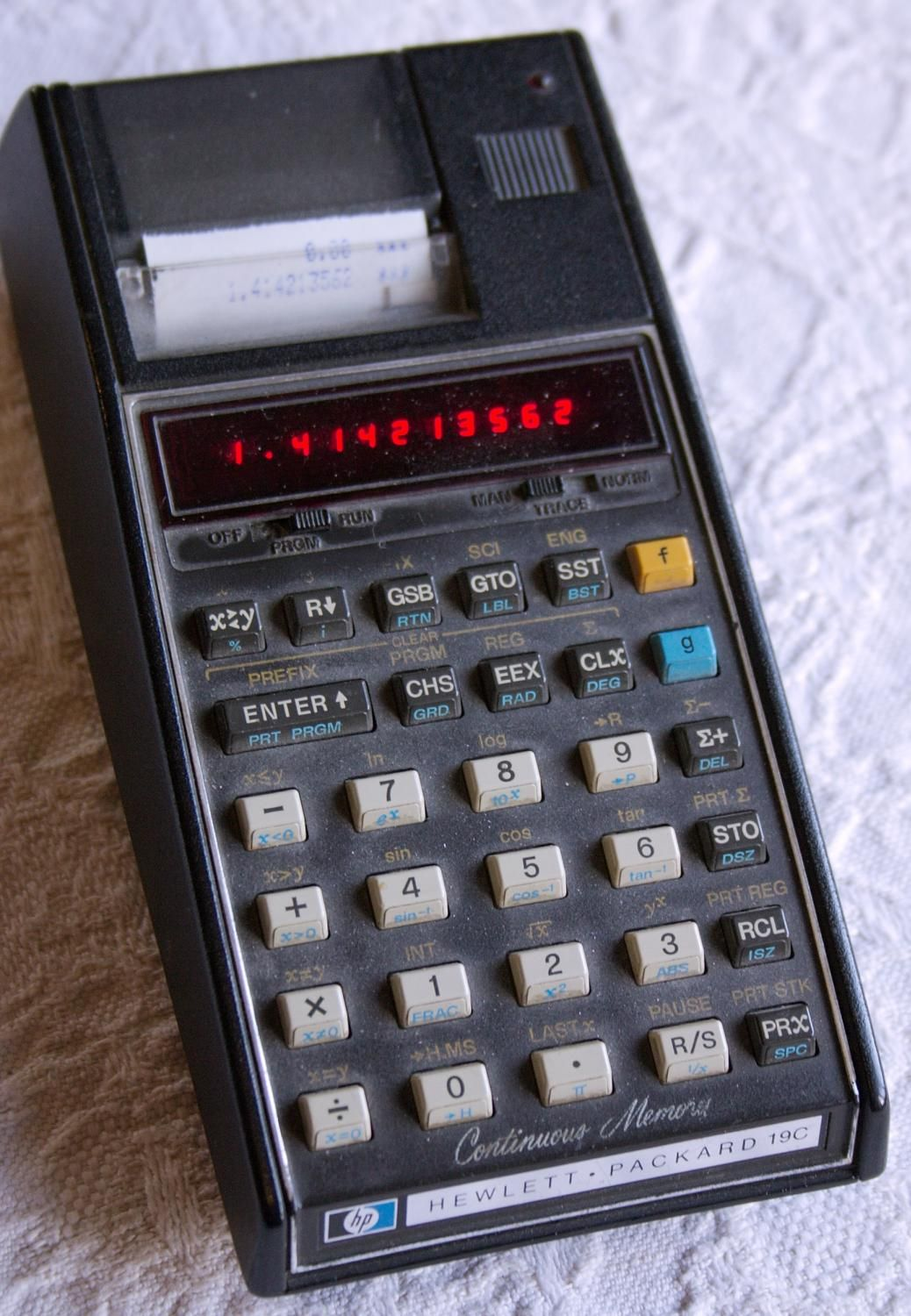
HP-19C calculator

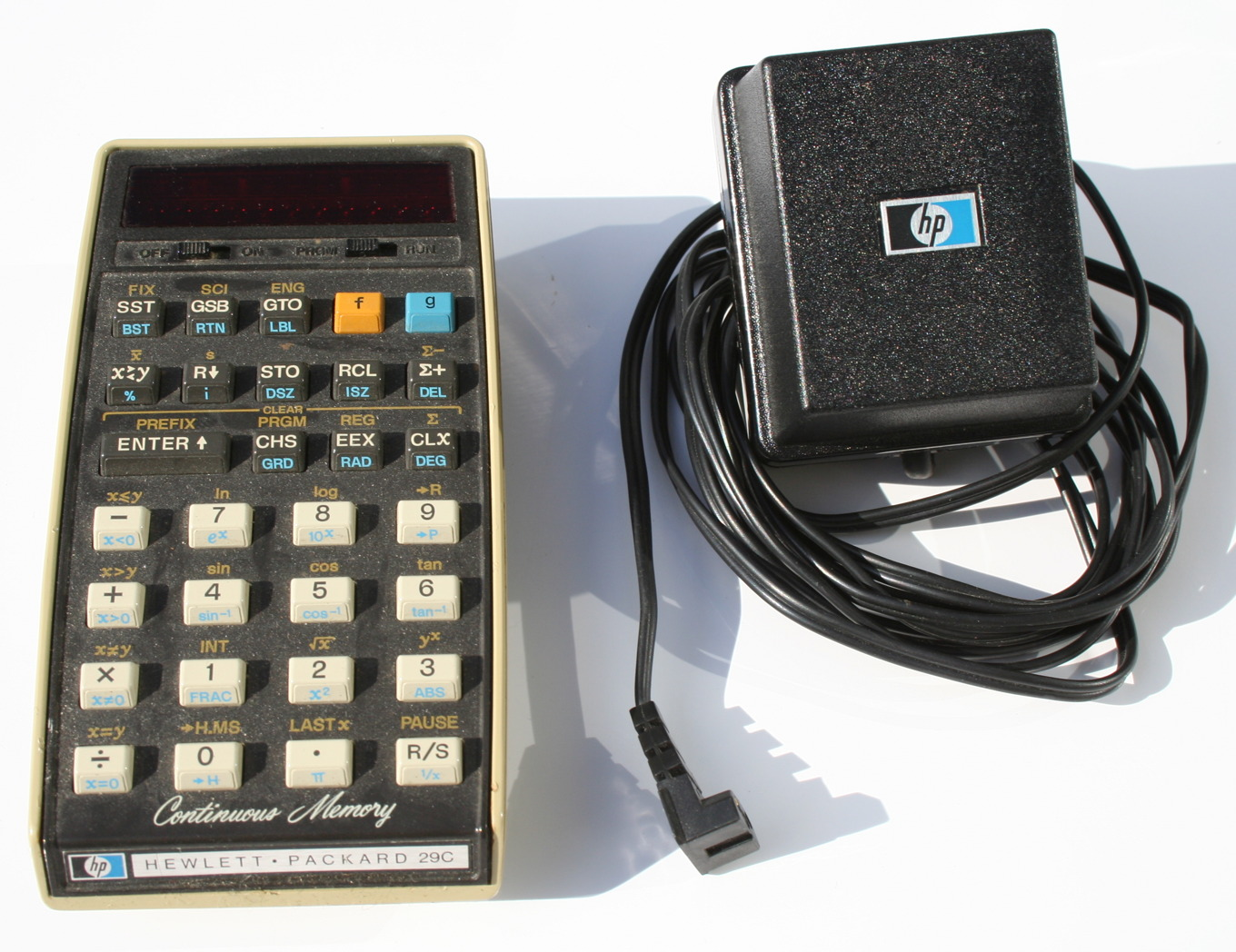
HP-29C with AC-powered battery charger

The HP-19C and HP-29C were scientific/engineering pocket calculators made by Hewlett-Packard between 1977 and 1979. They were the most advanced and last models of the "20" family (compare HP-25) and included Continuous Memory (battery-backed CMOS memory) as a standard feature.

The HP-19C included a small thermal printer, one of the very few hand-held scientific calculators to offer such a feature (HP-91, HP-92 and HP-97 were desktop units and later models like the HP-41C only supported external printers). Due to the printer's power requirements, the 19C used a battery pack of four AA-sized NiCd cells, adding to the weight of the calculator and printer mechanism.

All other capabilities were the same in both models – RPN expression logic, 98 program memory locations, statistical functions, and 30 registers.

Users could develop software for the HP-29C/19C, such as a prime number generator. The calculators expanded the HP-25's program capabilities by adding subroutines, increment/decrement looping, relative branching and indirect addressing (via register 0 as index).

HP's internal code name for the 29C was Bonnie, the 19C was correspondingly named Clyde.

The HP-19C and HP-29C were introduced at MSRPs of $345 and $195, respectively.

A version adapted to support an additional backward-facing display manufactured by Educational Calculator Devices named EduCALC 29C GD existed as well.

== Simulators and emulators ==
- HP-29C simulator for Windows
- HP-19C and HP-29C emulators for Windows
- HP Calculator emulators for Linux

HP-29C microcode emulator for any platform

HP-29C microcode emulator for Windows
