= Casio 9850 series =

Series of graphing calculators by Casio

Casio CFX-9850G series
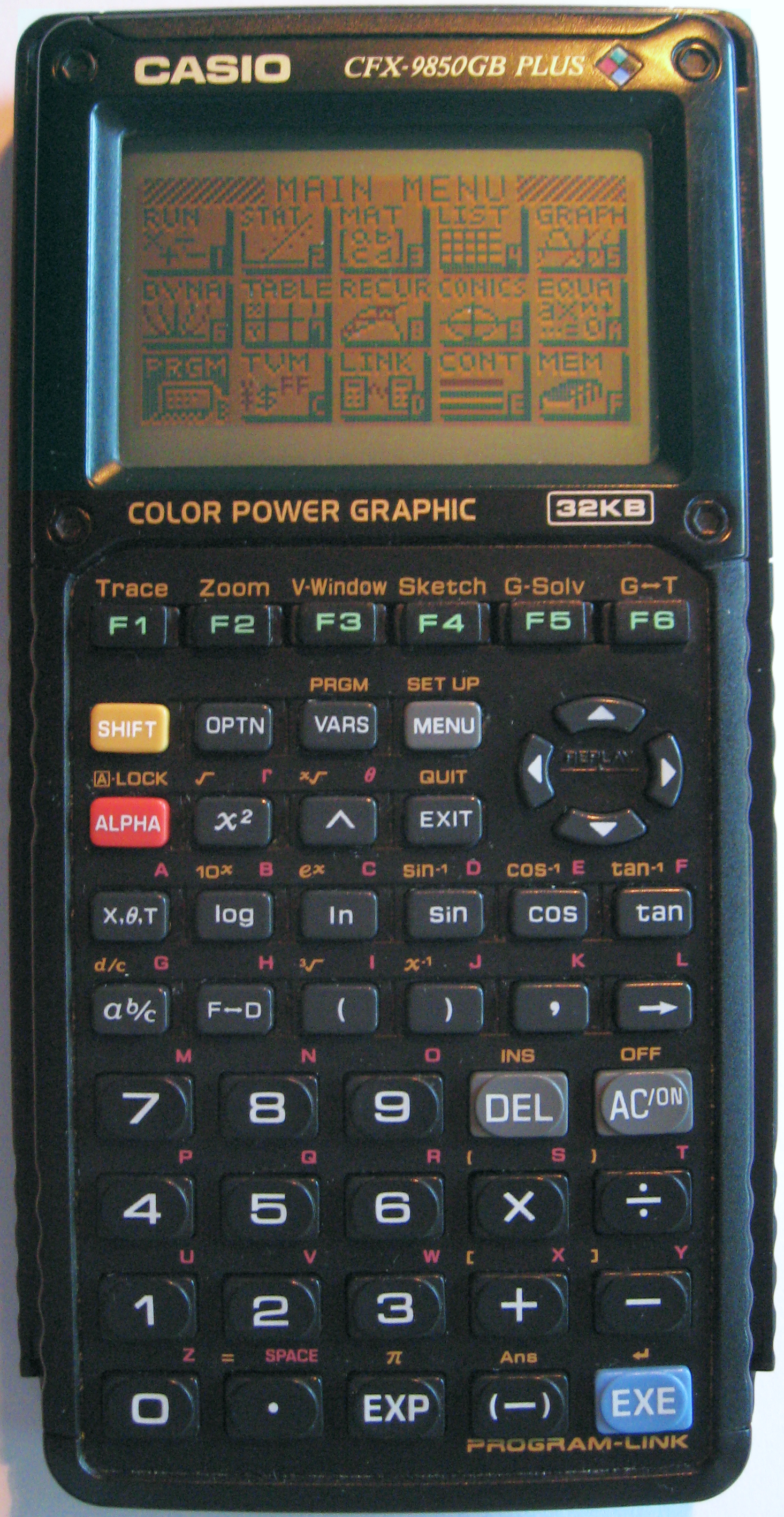
- Black model of the CFX-9850GB PLUS with protective slide cover, showing the menu-based interface on its screen.
- Type: Programmable Graphing
- Manufacturer: Casio
- Introduced: 1996
- Discontinued: 2008
- Successor: 9860 series

Calculator
- Entry mode: Infix
- Display type: LCD Dot-matrix
- Display size: 128×64 pixels

Programming
- Programming language(s): Casio BASIC
- User memory: 32-64 kibibyte

Other
- Power supply: four AAA alkaline batteries
- Weight: 190 grams

The Casio CFX-9850G series is a series of graphing calculators manufactured by Casio Computer Co., Ltd. from 1996 to 2008.

== fx-9750G ==
=== Power ===
The back of the device shows a slightly protruding battery case cover, which slides out to reveal the compartment for the four AAA alkaline batteries used for primary power, and a CR2032 lithium button cell used for memory backup when primary power is down or being changed. The device consumes power at the rate of 0.06W, and turns itself off automatically after about 6 minutes of time spent without any keypad activity. Battery life for the primary power cells ranges from 300 hours (LR03 battery) to 200 hours (R03 battery) for continuous display of main menu. Backup cells last up to about 2 years each.

The calculators weigh about 190 grams including batteries, and measure about 19.7 mm x 83 mm x 176 mm. Features include scientific calculations, including calculus, graphing and programming, statistics and matrix operations.

=== Display ===
The display has a graphics resolution of 127 by 63 pixels (the first row and column of pixels are unusable in graphing), and a character resolution of 21 columns by 8 lines. The bottom line is reserved for function key menu tips, and the rest is available for the graphics and character display.

=== Memory ===
The calculators includes program capacity of 26 kilobytes. This is divided among storage blocks for programs, statistics, matrices, lists, static and dynamic graphs and their associated settings, functions, recursions, equations, financial data, and variables (all of which are global). These can be cleared individually or completely in the MEM menu.

When saving files, a file name uses 17 bytes of memory.

A command consumes 1 or 2 bytes.

=== Graphing ===
Graphs can be drawn with split-screen viewing of graphs as well as tables or zooms. Graphed areas can be shaded in customizable colors. The graph viewport can be resized and shifted (these settings can be saved for later retrieval), and points along the graph curves can be traced. Graph solver tools can also be used to find useful points, such as maxima/minima and intersection points. The calculator also has a special section for advanced conic section graphing. Dynamic graphing provides all the functionality of regular graphing, but allows the binding of a variable in the graph equation to time over a value range.

=== Lists and tables ===
Up to 36 lists can be stored and manipulated in various ways in the list manager. The lists can also be used to feed data into inbuilt statistics operations, producing various statistical figures, performing regression analysis, and generating graphs like scatter and box and whisker plots, among others. Tables can be generated from functions, recursive series can be generated, and equations can be solved - both simultaneous and polynomial.

=== Communications ===
The device can link up by cable to a computer (FA-122 and FA-123 (serial) and FA-124 (USB) interface unit and cables) or to another calculator (SB-62 cable) to transfer data, such as programs, equations, graphs etc. It can also connect to a Casio label printer (SB-62 cable). Transmission speed is stated as 9600 byte/s. The calculator can be connected to the EA-100 data logger which is used to read data such as temperature, light intensity, force, voltage, loudness, pH and other such data in the same fashion as the Texas Instruments Computer Based Laboratory and various data loggers for use with the Hewlett-Packard calculators; Sharp also makes such a tool.

The serial link cable was designed and U.S. patented (5504864) by Larry Berg of Purple Computing. It was manufactured by Traveling Software (AKA Laplink.com) and later by Purple Computing for Casio. The common name for the cable used by the companies was "PC-Link". It has a 2.5mm stereo phono plug on one end, the patented electronic circuit inside the plastic bump and a DE-9F on the other for connecting to the serial port of a PC. The circuit converts low voltage low power signals of the handheld device to be compatible with the levels and power of a PC's RS-232 serial port. Versions of the circuit were used by many companies from the early 1990s to bridge the RS-232/TTL voltage/power gap.

== fx-9750G PLUS, CFX-9850G, CFX-9950G series ==
Changes from fx-9750G include:

- Introduction of statistical tests (1/2-sample Z, 1/2-proportion Z, 1/2-sample t, linear regression t, chi-square, 2-sample F, ANOVA), confidence interval calculations (1/2-sample Z, 1/2-proportion Z, 1/2-sample t), generate graphs based on statistical distribution type (normal probability density/distribution probability, inverse cumulative normal distribution, student-t probability density/distribution probability, chi-square/F/binomial/Poisson/geometric distribution probability), financial calculations.
- Numerical integration includes Gauss-Konrod Rule option.
- For CFX-9850GB PLUS and CFX-9950GB PLUS, inclusion of software library.
- The rounded rectangular keys were redesigned to become circular (F1-F6, cursor keys), or elliptical (2nd-5th rows from top), or rounded elliptical triangle (numeric keypad keys at the bottom 4 rows). Case gets rounder at the edges and concave along the longitudinal middle.

The Casio CFX-9850G was introduced in 1996. As a higher-end version of the FX-9750G series, The CFX-9850G introduced a number of enhancements over that series, the most noticeable being a color LCD capable of displaying orange, green, and blue. The CFX-9850G was later replaced with updated models that added features and fixed bugs, the CFX-9850G Plus, Ga Plus, GB Plus, and GC Plus. The CFX-9850GB Plus includes a built-in software library, and the CFX-9850GC Plus increases memory from 32k to 64k. Two other models were sold alongside the CFX-9850G series, the CFX-9950G series, which has 64k of memory, and the CFX-9970G, which has symbolic algebra. The series was discontinued with the CFX-9850GC Plus in 2008.

There are French versions where the ab/c and EXP buttons are labelled differently. (French versions: 9750=Graph 30,35,fx-8930GT; 9850,9950=Graph 60,65,CFX-9930GT,9940,9960; 9970=Graph 80)

=== Power ===
Power consumption is same as fx-9750.

Battery life for the primary battery ranges from 320 hours (LR03 battery) to 180 hours (R03 battery) for continuous display of main menu. For continuous operation (5/55 minutes calculation/display), battery life ranges from 280 hours (LR03 battery) to 160 hours (R03 battery).

=== Display ===
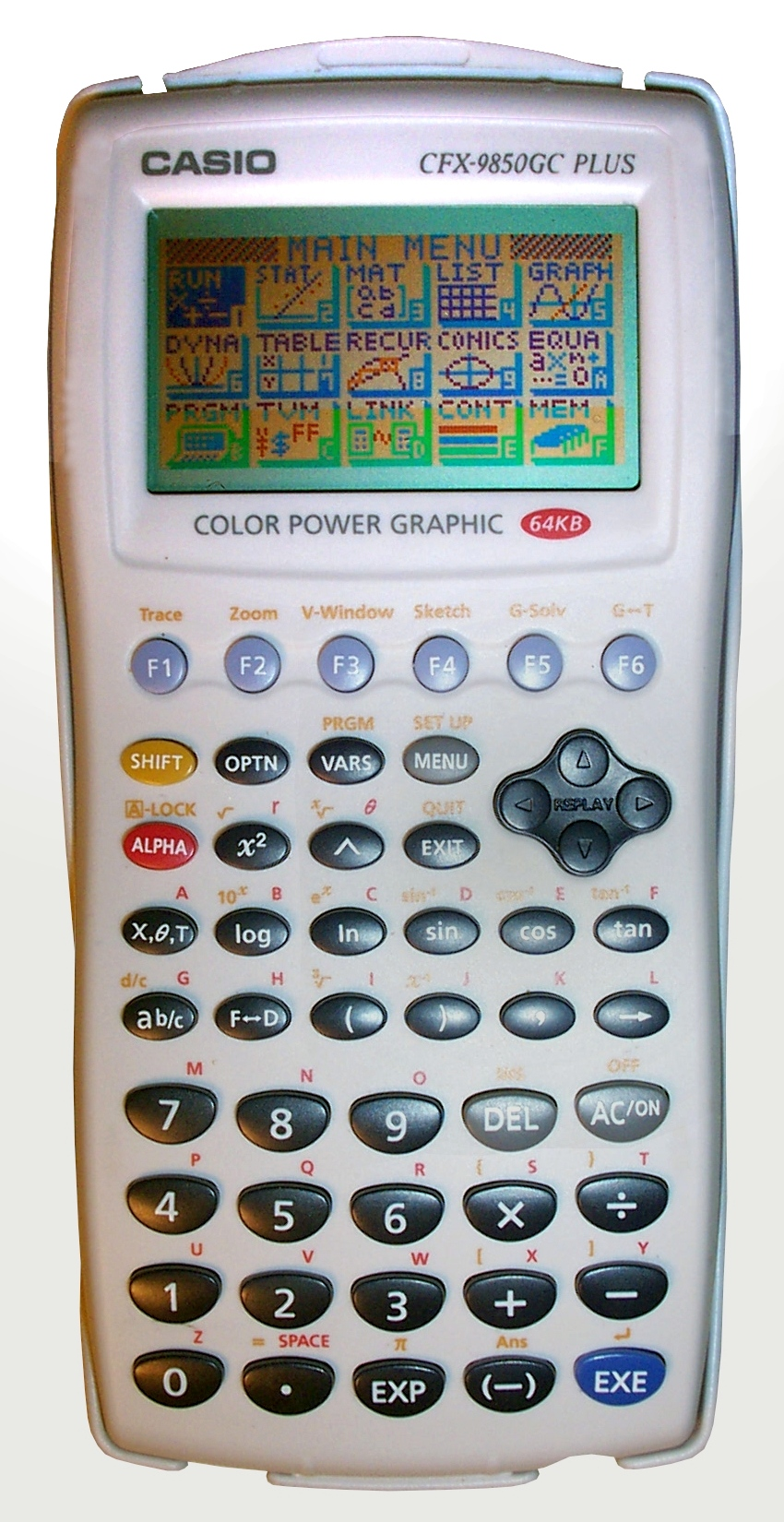
Casio CFX-9850GC Plus

CFX models are capable of displaying three colors: orange, blue and green. The colors are handled much like a multi-level grayscale display, in that altering the contrast of a pixel changes its color. A light contrast displays orange, then as the contrast increases, the color becomes blue, then green at a dark contrast.

=== Memory ===
The calculators include program capacity of 28 to 64 kilobytes of memory depending on model:

- fx-9750G PLUS: 28,000
- CFX-9850G PLUS: 30,000
- CFX-9850GB PLUS: 30,000
- CFX-9850GC PLUS: 61,000
- CFX-9950GB PLUS: 61,000

=== Software Library ===
The CFX-9850GB PLUS and CFX-9950GB PLUS models have a built-in software library, consisting of programs that perform complicated calculations and data processing. For example, operations on differential equations, digital caliper measurements, capacitor charge curves, figure rotations and Riemann sums. These are organized into six sub-libraries, five of them for mathematical computations, and one for scientific instrumentation.

=== Financial calculations ===
A number of financial operations such as interest compounding and amortization are also provided.

== CFX-9970G ==
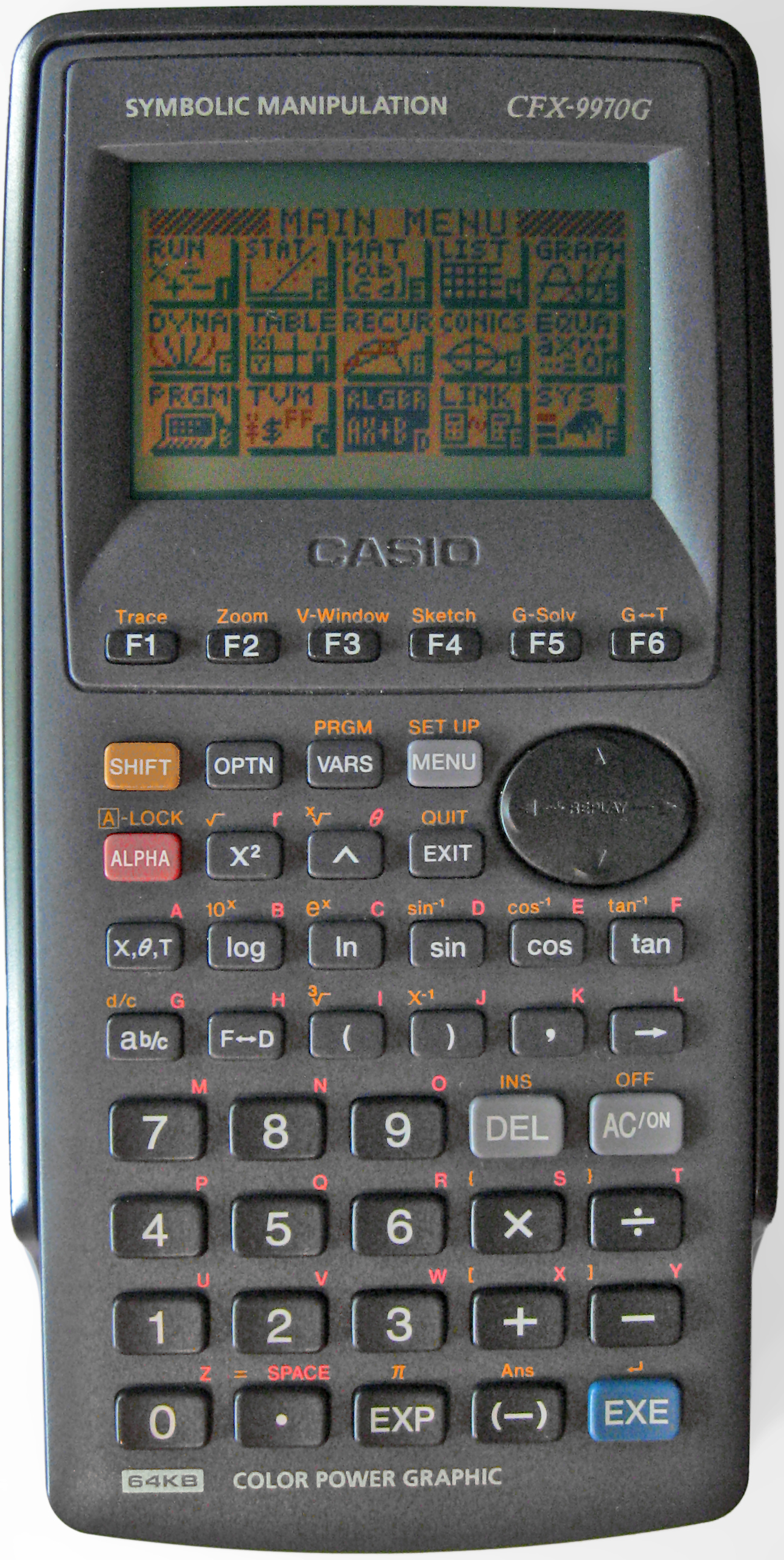
Casio CFX-9970G

Changes from CFX-9950GB PLUS include:

- CAS (algebra mode), it is the first Casio calculator to include CAS, and the first calculator with color screen and CAS. The algebra mode can perform a lot of symbolic manipulations, like expand, solve, derivatives, integrals (definite or indefinite), etc. In the algebra mode, the output is shown as natural screen, feature later included for input or output in modern calculators like fx-991ES.
- Reduced power consumption to 0.2 watt. Battery life for the primary battery ranges from 230 hours (LR03 battery) to 140 hours (R03 battery) for continuous display of main menu.
- Revert to the use of rounded rectangular buttons in all except direction keys. A single elliptical pad replaces all 4 separate direction keys.
- Software library is not included.
- The calculators includes program capacity of 60 kilobytes of memory.

== Manuals ==
- Manuals at support.casio.com
