= Sharp PC-1350 =

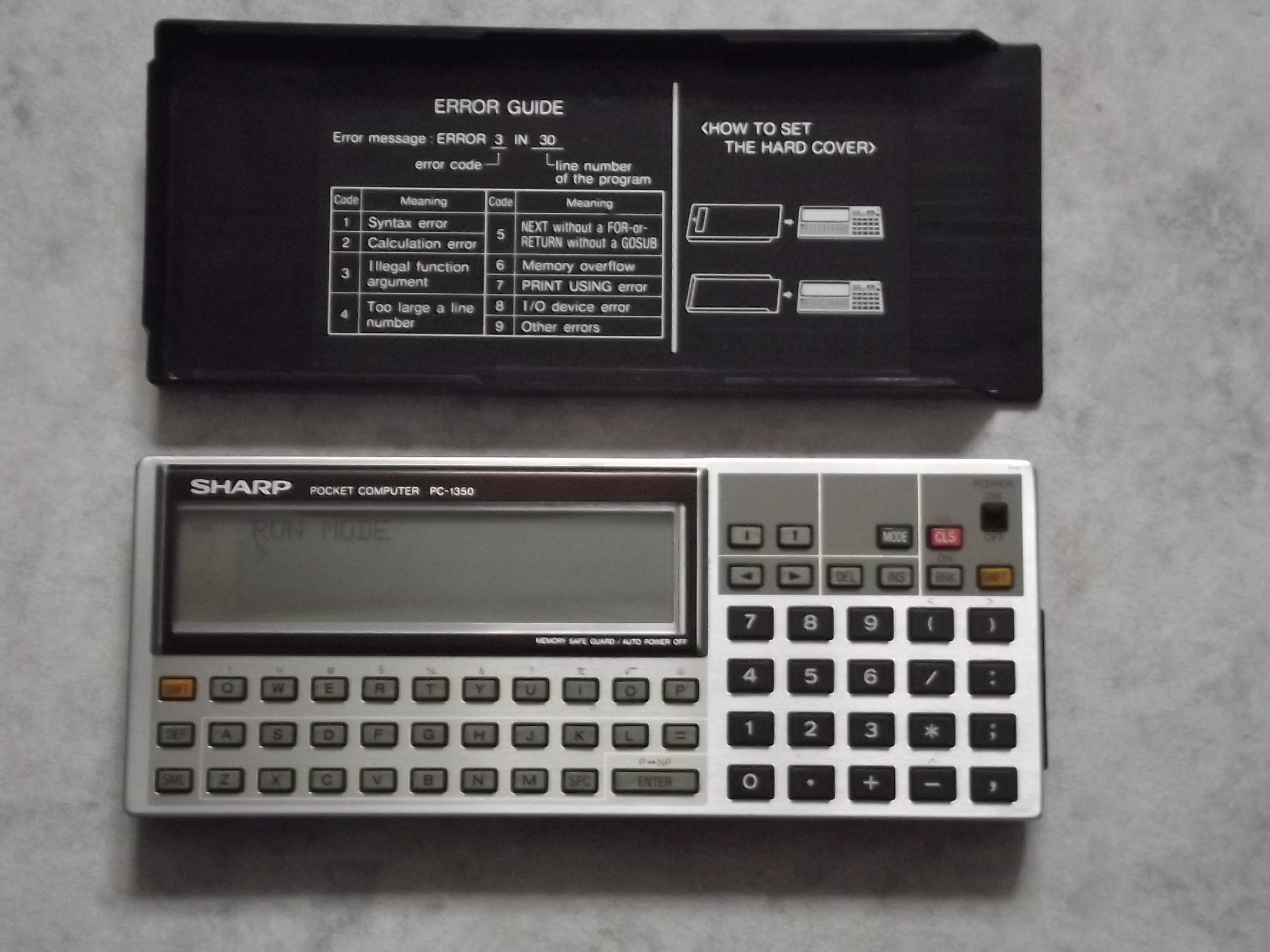
Sharp PC-1350

The Sharp PC-1350 is a small pocket computer manufactured by Sharp. The PC-1350 was introduced in 1984 and was used by engineers, and favored by programmers for its programming and graphical capabilities. It was superseded in 1987 by the PC-1360, which featured one additional RAM expansion port, improved BASIC, floppy disk capability, and a faster CPU.

== Technical specifications ==
Listed below are the technical specification of the PC-1350 and PC-1360 models.

- CMOS 8-bit CPU SC61860 at 768 kHz
- 24x4 character (150x32 pixels) LCD controlled by SC43537 display LSI chip
- 4 KiB RAM on 2x HM6116 chip
- 40 KiB System ROM (8 KiB CPU internal, 32 KiB external on SC613256 chip)
- Integrated piezo speaker (beep only)
- I/O Sharp custom interfaces for printers and tape recorders
- I/O RS-232 at TTL level
- Powered by two CR-2032 lithium batteries (consumption max. 5 mA during arithmetical computing, 20 uA during poweroff)
- Built-in BASIC interpreter
- RAM expansion port, for up to 20 KiB of RAM in total.

== See also ==
- Sharp pocket computer character sets
