= List of Soviet calculators =

This is a list of calculators created and produced in Soviet Union.

== Mechanical computers ==
- Odhner Arithmometer
- VK-1

== Electromechanical computers ==
- Bystritsa
- Bystritsa-2
- Bystritsa-3
- SDV-107
- VK-2
- VK-3
- VMM-2
- VMP-2

== Relay calculators ==
- Vilnyus
- Vyatka

== Electrical calculators ==
- Contact-N, Kleyster-N, Spika
- EDVM
- Orbita
- Rasa
- Ros
- Vega

=== "Elka" series, Bulgaria ===
- Elka 22
- Elka 43
- Elka 50M
- Elka 55
- Soemtron 220

=== "Iskra" series ===
- Iskra 108/108D
- Iskra 11
- Iskra 110
- Iskra 1103
- Iskra 111/111I/111M/111T
- Iskra 112/112L
- Iskra 1121
- Iskra 1122
- Iskra 114
- Iskra 12
- Iskra 121
- Iskra 122/122-1
- Iskra 123
- Iskra 124
- Iskra 125
- Iskra 12M
- Iskra 13
- Iskra 210
- Iskra 22
- Iskra 2210
- Iskra 2240/2240M

=== "Elektronika" series ===
- Elektronika 24-71
- Elektronika 4-71/4-71B/4-71C
- Elektronika 4-73B
- Elektronika 68
- Elektronika C2
- Elektronika EKVM D3
- Elektronika EKVM-P
- Elektronika Epos-73A
- Elektronika T3-16
- Elektronika-70

==== "Elektronika B3" series ====
"B" in "B3" stands for "bytovaya" (Russian: бытовая), which means "domestic".

- Elektronika B3-01
- Elektronika B3-02
- Elektronika B3-04
- Elektronika B3-05/B3-05M
- Elektronika B3-08
- Elektronika B3-09/B3-09M
- Elektronika B3-10
- Elektronika B3-11
- Elektronika B3-14/B3-14K
- Elektronika B3-14M
- Elektronika B3-18/B3-18A/B3-18M
- Elektronika B3-19/B3-19M
- Elektronika B3-21
- Elektronika B3-23/B3-23A
- Elektronika B3-24/B3-24G
- Elektronika B3-25/B3-25A
- Elektronika B3-26/B3-26A
- Elektronika B3-30
- Elektronika B3-32
- Elektronika B3-34
- Elektronika B3-35
- Elektronika B3-36
- Elektronika B3-37
- Elektronika B3-38
- Elektronika B3-39
- Elektronika B3-54

==== "Elektronika C3" series ====
C in "C3" stands for Svetlana (company) (Russian: Светлана).

- Elektronika С3-07
- Elektronika С3-15
- Elektronika С3-22
- Elektronika С3-27/C3-27A
- Elektronika С3-33

==== "Elektronika MK" series ====
"MK" stands for "microcalculator" (Russian: микрокалькулятор).

- Elektronika MK-103
- Elektronika MK-104
- Elektronika MK-106
- Elektronika MK-107
- Elektronika MK-1103
- Elektronika MK-1104
- Elektronika MK-15
- Elektronika MK-18M
- Elektronika MK-22
- Elektronika MK-23/MK-23A
- Elektronika MK-33
- Elektronika MK-35
- Elektronika MK-36
- Elektronika MK-37/MK-37A/MK-37B
- Elektronika MK-38
- Elektronika MK-40
- Elektronika MK-41
- Elektronika MK-42
- Elektronika MK-44
- Elektronika MK-45
- Elektronika MK-46
- Elektronika MK-47
- Elektronika MK-51
- Elektronika MK-52
- Elektronika MK-53
- Elektronika MK-54
- Elektronika MK-56
- Elektronika MK-57/MK-57A/MK-57B/MK-57C
- Elektronika MK-59
- Elektronika MK-60/MK-60M
- Elektronika MK-61
- Elektronika MK-62
- Elektronika MK-64
- Elektronika MK-66
- Elektronika MK-68/68A
- Elektronika MK-69
- Elektronika MK-71
- Elektronika MK-77
- Elektronika MK-85/MK-85M/MK-85S
- Elektronika MK-87
- Elektronika MK-90
- Elektronika MK-91
- Elektronika MK-92
- Elektronika MK-93
- Elektronika MK-94/MK-94A
- Elektronika MK-95
- Elektronika MK-98
- Elektronika MK-PPV
- Elektronika MKSH-2/MKSH-2M
- Elektronika MKU-1

== Calculators for kids ==
- Detskaya Kassa
- Malysh

== See also ==
- Calculator
- Science and technology in the Soviet Union
