= Casio FX-602P series =

Series of programmable calculators produced by Casio

CASIO FX-602P series
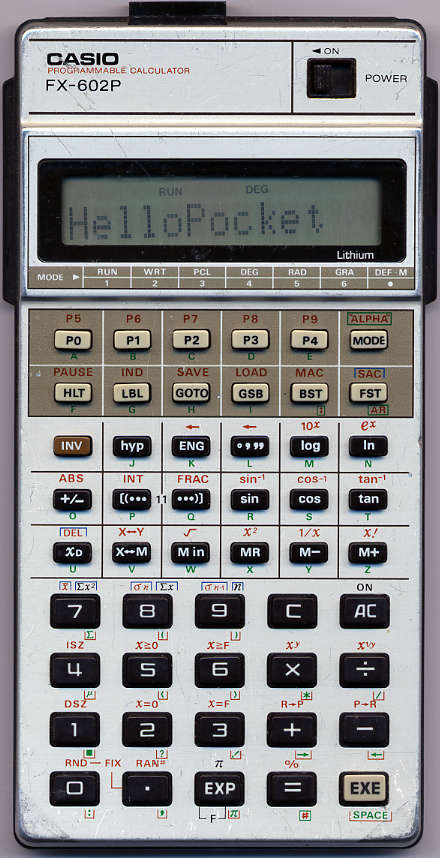
- A 28-year-old FX-602P in working condition
- Type: Programmable scientific
- Manufacturer: Casio
- Introduced: 1981; 45 years ago
- Discontinued: 1989
- Predecessor: Casio FX-502P series
- Successor: Casio FX-603P

Calculator
- Entry mode: Infix
- Precision: 12 digits mantissa, ±99 exponent
- Display type: LCD Dot-matrix
- Display size: 11 Characters + 3 digits

Programming
- Programming language(s): Keystroke (fully merged, Turing complete)
- Memory register: 11 (FX-601P) 22 .. 88 (FX-602P)
- Program steps: 128 (FX-601P) 32 .. 512 (FX-602P)

Interfaces
- Ports: one vendor specific
- Connects to: Compact Cassette via one of: FA-1; FA-2; FP-10 Spark printer via one of: Direct; FA-2

Other
- Power supply: 2×"CR-2032" Lithium
- Weight: 141g, 5 oz
- Dimensions: 15.24x7,6x1.2 cm, 6"×3"×½"

The FX-601P and FX-602P were programmable calculators, manufactured by Casio from 1981. It was the successor model to the Casio FX-502P series and was itself succeeded in 1990 by the Casio FX-603P.

== Display ==
The FX-601P series featured a single line dot matrix display with 11 characters as its main display. An additional 3 digits 7-segment display was used to display exponents as well as program steps when entering or debugging programs. There were 11 status indicators.

== Programming ==
The programming model employed key stroke programming by which each key pressed was recorded and later played back. On record, multiple key presses were merged into a single programming step. Only a few operations needed two bytes. Synthetic programming was possible but not very common.

The FX-601P could store 128 fully merged steps and data could be stored in 11 memory register. The memory of the FX-602P could be partitioned between somewhere from 32 to 512 fully merged steps, and data could be stored in 22 to 88 memory register. The default set-up was 22 register and 512 steps. From there one could trade 8 steps for one additional register or 80 steps for 11 register with the 11th register begin a so-called "F" register.

Like its predecessor, the FX-602P series supported 10 labels for programs and subroutines called P0 .. P9. Each program or subroutine could have up to 10 local labels called LBL0 .. LBL9 for jumps and branches.

The FX-601P and FX-602P supported indirect addressing both for memory access and jumps and therefore the programming model could be considered Turing complete.

Both the FX-601P and FX-602P could load and execute programs from their predecessors.

=== Programming example ===
This program computes the factorial of an integer number from 2 to 69. For 5!, the user enters 5 P0 to produce the result, 120. The program occupies 9 bytes of memory.

Key-code	Comment
P0	You'll call the program with the P0 key
M in00	stores the value in register 0
1	starts with 1
LBL0	label for the loop
*	multiply
MR00	by n
DSZ GOTO0	decrements M00 and back to LBL0 until M00=0
=	end of loop, the machine has calculated $1 \times n \times ( n - 1) \times \cdots \times 2 \times 1 =n!$

== Interface ==
Casio FA-2
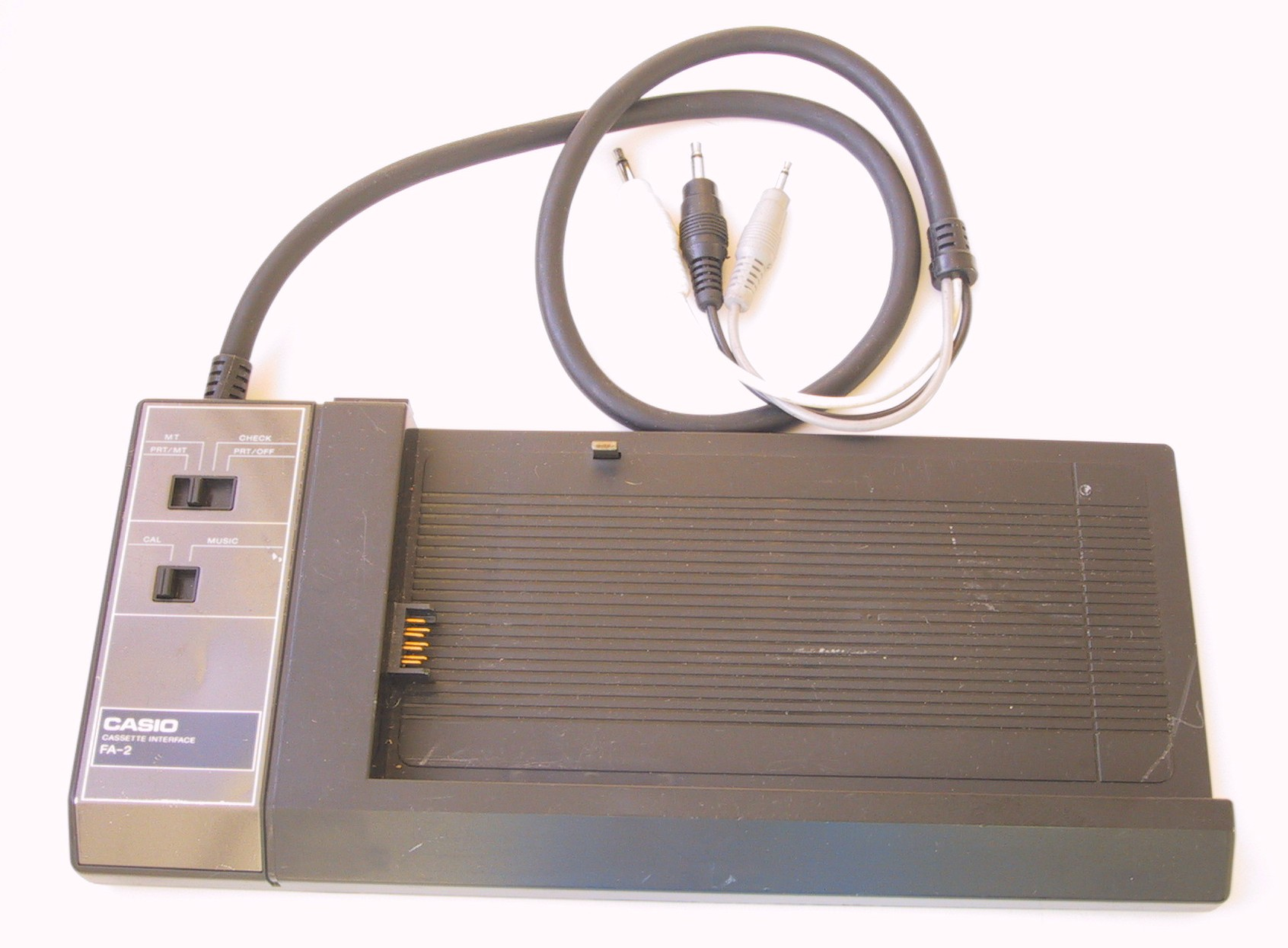
- Connects to: FX-602P series and FX-702P Compact Cassette via one of: Line-Out: 3.5mm TRS connector; Mic-In: 3.5mm TRS connector; Tape Start/Stop: 2.5mm TRS connector
- Manufacturer: Casio
- Introduced: 1981
- Type: Compact Cassette Interface

The FX-601P and FX-602P used the same FA-1 interface as used by the FX-502P line of calculators or alternatively the newer FA-2 interface which was also used by Casio FX-702P. Both interfaces featured a Kansas City standard Compact Cassette interface.

The FA-2 Interface was used by the FX-602P series of programmable calculator and the FX-702P Pocket Computer to store programs and data register to Compact Cassette. When compared with its predecessor the Casio FA-1, the FA-2 featured an additional tape control output and connector for the Casio FP-10 printer.
