= Scinote =

Scinote may refer to:

- Scientific notation, a form of numeric notation
- Scientific pitch notation, a form of musical notation
- sciNote (software)
