= Elektronika MK-52 =

Programmable calculator

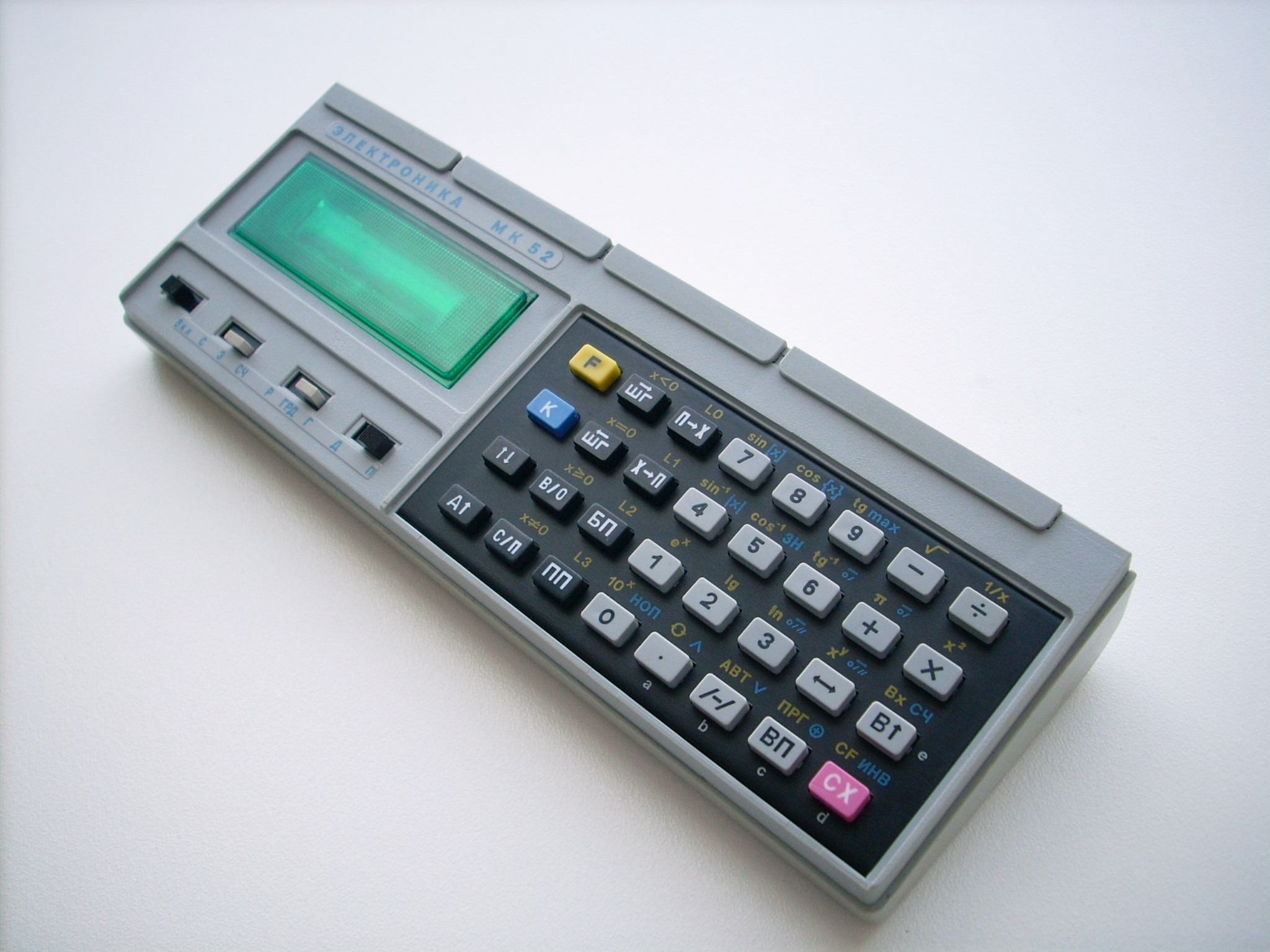
Elektronika MK-52 programmable calculator

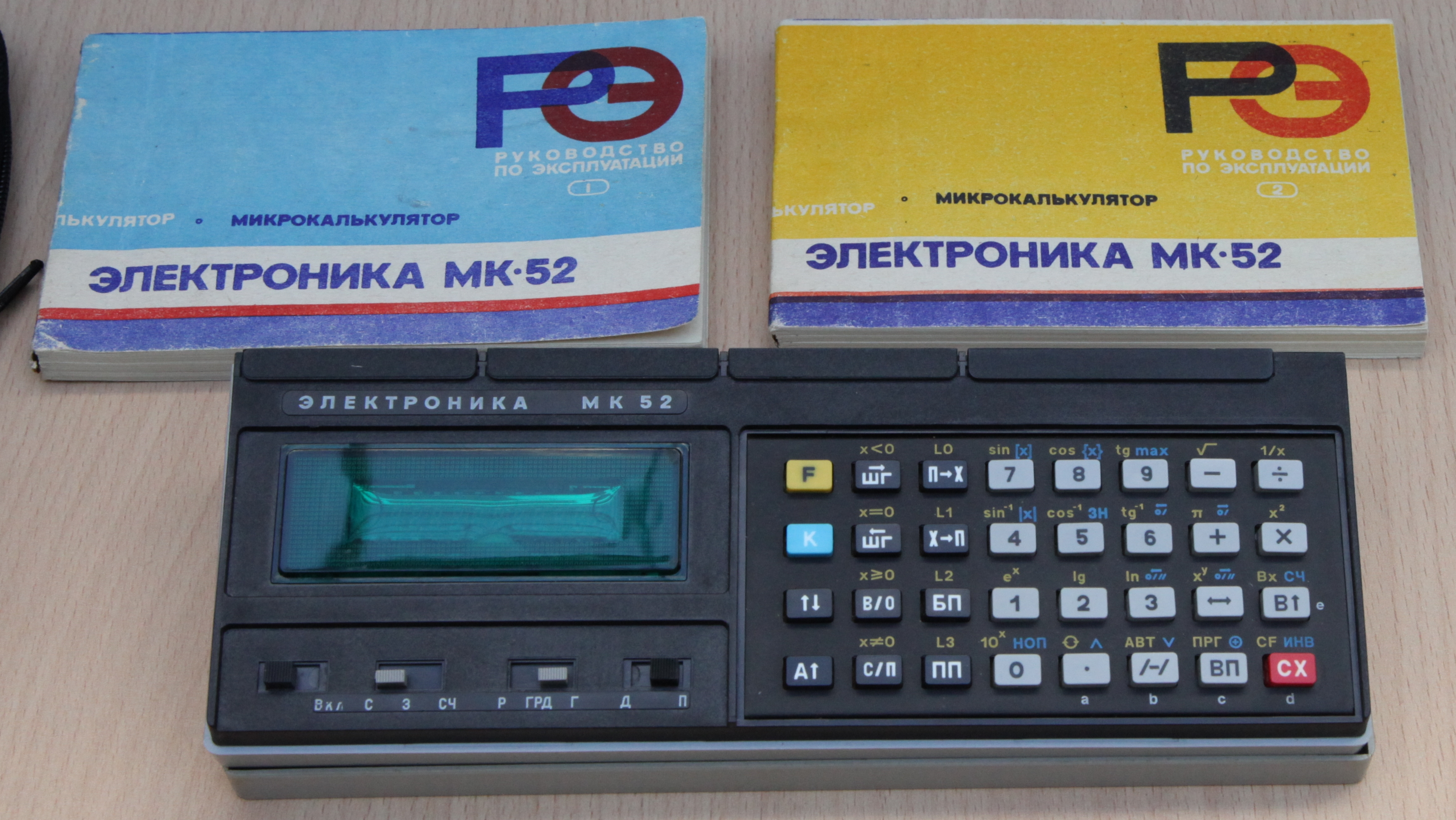
Elektronika MK52, Электроника МК-52, calculator; period 1983–1991; ROMː 512 B; RAMː 15 registers; 105 program steps; displayː VFD, 8 + 2 characters; size: 78 × 212 × 35 mm; weight: 250 g, 4 × AA battery

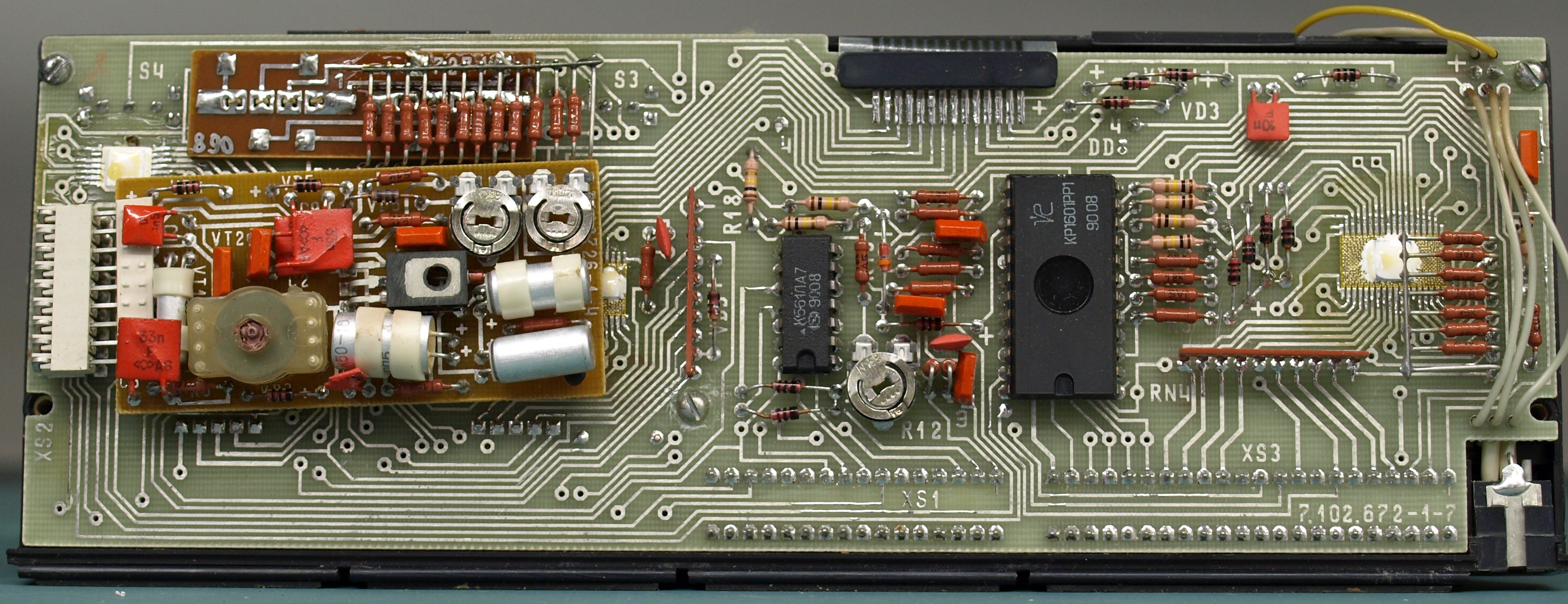
Elektronika MK-52 Calculator PCB

The Elektronika MK-52 (Russian: Электро́ника МК-52) is an RPN-programmable calculator manufactured in the Soviet Union from 1983 to 1992 at the Quasar and Kvadr plants in Ukraine. It belongs to the third generation of Soviet programmable calculators. Its original selling price was 115 rubles.

The MK-52 is a backwards compatible improvement to the Elektronika MK-61, the main changes being the addition of an internal non-volatile EEPROM module for permanent data storage, a diagnostic slot, and a slot for separately sold ROM modules. The machine code and functionality of the MK-52 and MK-61 calculators were extensions of the earlier MK-54, B3-34, and B3-21 Elektronika calculators. The MK-52 is the only calculator known to have internal storage in the form of an EEPROM module. As with many Soviet calculators, the MK-52 has a number of undocumented functions.

In November 1988, the MK-52 went into space on the Soyuz TM-7 spacecraft, where it could have been used as a backup to the onboard computers.

== Architecture ==
The MK-52 has 105 locations of volatile program memory, an internal EEPROM module (with 512 bytes of memory), and 15 7-byte registers. It uses four AA-size battery cells or can be plugged into a power adapter. It has a relatively dim, ten-digit ИЛЦ2-12/8Л green vacuum fluorescent display; these ten digits are apportioned into an 8 digit mantissa and a 2 digit exponent. The MK-52 has an expansion port to which various ROM modules can be attached. Its system clock speed is approximately 75 kHz (derived from a К745ГФ3-2 four-phase clock generator chip), and it weighs approximately 400 grams.

The MK-52 is the first Soviet micro-calculator with non-volatile memory; this is provided by a КР1601РР1 EEPROM, with a capacity of 4 kilobits and capable of 10,000 rewrites, ensuring security for programs and working memory when powered off. This memory is capable of storing up to 512 1-byte program words (or the contents of 72 7-byte registers) and exchanging its contents with the calculator's RAM.

The calculator is fully compatible with the second-generation models (B3-34 and MK-54), using the same command system and machine codes. On average, a program that takes all 105 steps of program memory and 15 registers on the MK-52 will be equivalent in capability to approximately 140-150 steps and 18 registers on the B3-34. Additionally, the MK-52 has an extended set of commands that can allocate integer and fractional parts of numbers, search for absolute and maximum values of numbers, and perform certain logical operations.

=== ROM ===
In addition, there is an external ROM which is a memory expansion unit with stored games and mathematical programs, produced by the manufacturer, that constitute the user library. Manufacturers have produced 4 types of ROM cartridges, three of them containing various mathematical functions, and one, the BRP-4, containing game programs:

BRP-2 "Astro" (Russian: БРП-2 "Астро"), with a set of programs for navigational tasks, information about which was published in issue 12, of 1988, of the Russian-language monthly magazine Морском сборнике (Marine Digest);

BRP-3 (Russian: БРП-3), containing 60 programs for solving mathematical problems. In 1988, 15,200 units of this ROM were manufactured, and were sold at a price of 16 rubles.

BRP-4 (Russian: БРП-4) was produced in 1989, containing game programs.

GRP "Geo".

Another expansion port was used for diagnostics during manufacture; this port could also be used to connect the calculator to external peripherals.

== Basic operations ==
The MK-52 has two main modes of operation: automatic mode and programming mode. General calculations and operations are performed in automatic mode, while programs are fed as input in programming mode. The keystroke sequence F+/-/ switches the MK-52 to automatic mode, while F+ВП switches it to programming mode.

Manual calculations in automatic mode are in accordance with Reverse Polish Notation logic. For example, to evaluate 2+3, the following keystrokes are required: 2 + В↑ + 3 + +.

=== Bitwise binary operations ===
The MK-52 is fully capable of performing Boolean operations on binary numbers. The following example demonstrates the OR logical operation on the binary numbers 111000 and 100001:

Binary numbers are input into the calculator as hexadecimal numbers prepended by an 8.

First, the operator must divide the numbers into groups of four digits, adding leading zeros if necessary, e.g. splitting 111000 into groups of four gives 0011 and 1000. The equivalent hexadecimal values of these two four-digit binary numbers are 3 and 8, respectively, which equal hexadecimal 38.

Similarly, 100001 is equivalent to hexadecimal 21.

So, the numbers 8.38 and 8.21 are entered into the MK-52 and the OR operation is performed on them. The OR operation is achieved by pressing K+/-/.

The result displayed should be 8.39, which translates into binary 0011 and 1001, and, hence, the binary number 111001, which is the result.

The following list details the MK-52's graphical representation of hexadecimal numbers: 0, 1, 2, 3, 4, 5, 6, 7, 8, 9, -, L, C, Г, E, (blank). Normal hexadecimal representation is 0, 1, 2, 3, 4, 5, 6, 7, 8, 9, A, B, C, D, E, F.

== Programming ==
The MK-52's programming commands are typed into the MK-52 in programming mode and are then executed. The MK-52 is fully capable of being programmed to manage memory and to use both conditional and unconditional branching.

In programming mode, the screen displays information about the program in memory, represented by two hexadecimal-digit operation codes. For example, if 10 01 0E 03 is displayed, then this means that 0E is stored at program step 00, 01 is stored at program step 01, 10 is stored at program step 02, and the machine is prompting for data to be input, to be stored at program step 03.

As an example, the following short program performs continuous addition to get an idea of the speed of the Elektronika MK 52 calculator:

The keystrokes to enter the program for the Elektronika MK-52 calculator are as follows:

F ПРГ
В↑
1
+
B/0
C/П
F ABT

To execute it:

1
B/0
C/П

To stop it:

C/П or CX

Calculator's rough speed can be measured by using a stopwatch, and terminating the program after a specific time elapsed.

=== Saving to EEPROM ===
Before entering a program to volatile memory with the intention of saving this program to EEPROM memory, the EEPROM program space to be saved to must be cleared first, which clears the volatile memory as well as the selected area of the EEPROM memory.

Each program step requires 1 byte of memory and each data register requires 7 bytes of memory.

When clearing, reading, or writing to the EEPROM memory, the address and range are specified by a six-digit number, preceded by a non-zero number, in automatic mode: e.g. 1aaaadd specifies that dd bytes are to be stored starting at memory address aaaa. A two-position data/program switch controls whether data (from the registers) or program memory is transferred; a three-position switch is used to select read, write, and clear operations.

== Additional information ==
The Elektronika MK-52 originally sold for 115 rubles. It was produced in a variety of colorways, including black and grey, turquoise and blue, white and grey, and orange. As typical for Soviet electronics, technical schematics were provided for the MK-52 when it was purchased, facilitating user modification and repair of the machine.

Elektronika MK-52 schematics

=== Error message ===
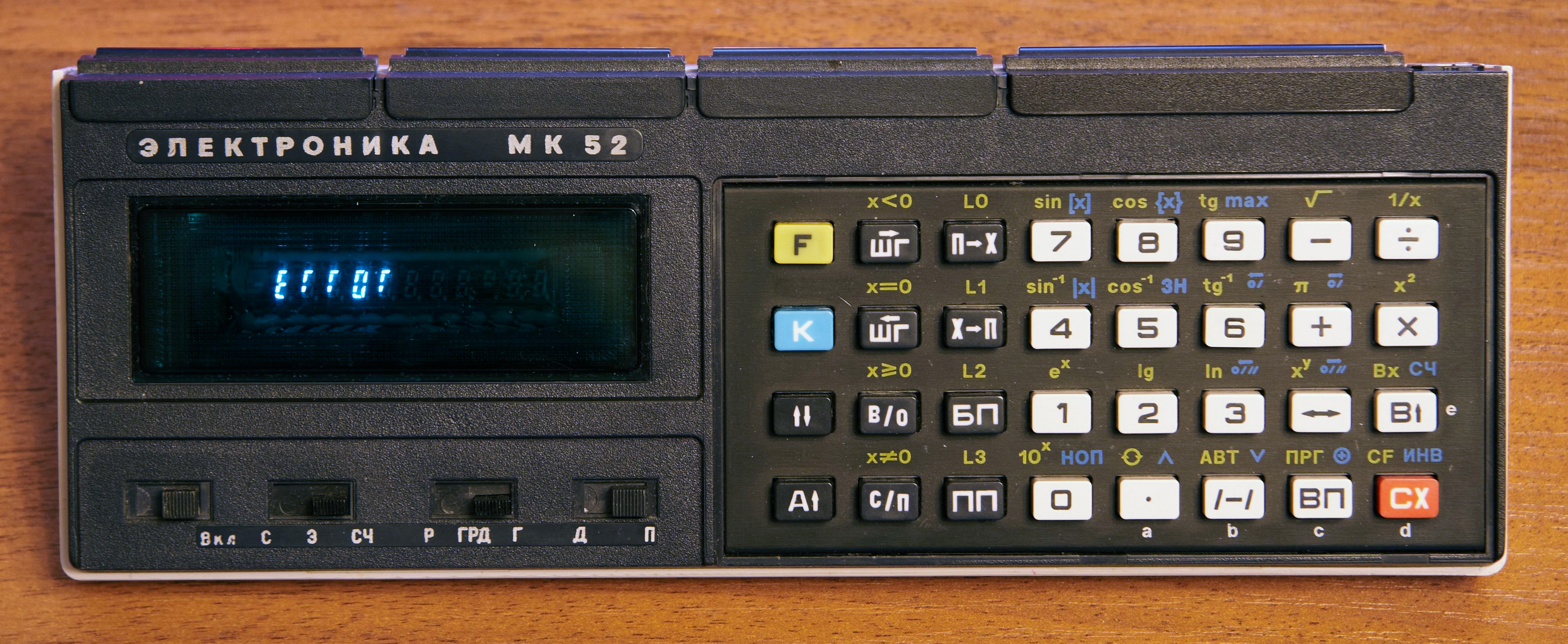
MK-52 displaying ЕГГОГ

When an error was encountered on the machine, the display produced a message similar to the English word "error". The word, written in this fashion, cut down on the number of display segments used to display the error message, but this spelling, read as Cyrillic, would instead be pronounced "eggog" or "yeggog", depending on the language (the Cyrillic е is iotated in Russian and Belarusian – and, by extension, in the Russian-derived orthographies created for non-Slavic languages by the Soviet Union – but not in other Slavic languages such as Ukrainian, Bulgarian, or Serbian).

=== Games ===
There is a host of games available for the MK-52. The MK-52's undocumented functions tend to be heavily used in the games due to their ability to make unusual calculations and produce specialized displays. A simple example of the modification of the display is accomplished by the repeated squaring of 1×10^{50} (and ignoring error messages).

=== Use in outer space ===
In November 1988, the MK-52 went into space on the Soyuz TM-7 spacecraft, where it could have been used to calculate the trajectory of landing in the event of an onboard computer failure.

== Bugs ==
There is currently only 1 known bug in the MK-52: the MAX function returns zero if one of its two arguments is zero.
