= Casio FX-603P =

Programmable calculator produced by Casio

CASIO FX-603P
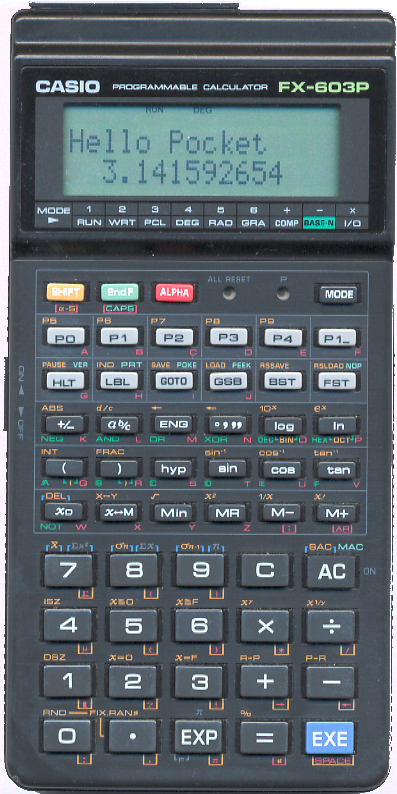
- An FX-603P in working condition
- Type: Programmable scientific
- Manufacturer: Casio
- Introduced: 1990

Calculator
- Entry mode: Infix
- Precision: 12 digits mantissa, ±99 exponent
- Display type: LCD Dot-matrix
- Display size: 2×16 Character

Programming
- Programming language(s): Keystroke (fully merged, Turing complete)
- Memory register: 110
- Program steps: 6,144

Interfaces
- Ports: one vendor specific
- Connects to: Compact Cassette via: FA-6; Line Printer via one of: FA-6; Centronics printer port; PC via one of: FA-6; RS-232

Other
- Power supply: 2×"CR-2032" Lithium + 1×"CR-2032" Lithium
- Weight: 141g, 5 oz
- Dimensions: 15.24x7,6x1.2 cm, 6"×3"×½"

The FX-603P was a programmable calculator, manufactured by Casio from 1990. It was the successor model to the Casio FX-602P. Since it was only released in a limited number of countries in small quantities, it is now an exceedingly rare item which commands high prices when sold.

== Display ==
The FX-603P featured a two line dot matrix display with 16 characters each as main display. An additional 4 digits 7-segment display used to display the program step when entering or debugging programs and 20 status indicators.

== Programming ==
The programming model employed was key stroke programming by which each key pressed was recorded and later played back. On record multiple key presses were merged into a single programming step. There were only a very few operations which needed two bytes.

The FX-603P could store 6,144 steps. Data could be stored in 110 memory register. The FX-603P series supported 20 labels for programs and subroutines called P0 .. P19 - twice the amount of the predecessor models. Each program or subroutine could have up to 10 local labels called LBL0 .. LBL9 for jumps and branches.

The FX-603P supported indirect addressing both for memory access and jumps and therefore programming model could be considered Turing complete.

The FX-603P was backward-compatible with the FX-602P could load FX-602P programs from Compact Cassette.

=== Programming example ===
Here is a sample program that computes the factorial of an integer number from 2 to 69. For 5!, you'll type 5 P0 and get the result, 120. With the additional alpha output the program is 14 byte long.

| Key-code | Comment |
|---|---|
| MODE2 | Change to mode 2 to enable editing of program areas P0 to P19 |
| P0 | From the program list, press P0 button to start editing the program area P0 |
| ALPHAn!=ALPHA | output "n!=" in first row of display. Result will be shown in 2nd line |
| HLT | waits for user input, user types in number and presses EXE button to continue program |
| Min00 | stores the value typed in by the user in register M00 |
| 1 | put 1 in current immediate register so there is a value to multiple with |
| LBL0 | label for the loop |
| * | multiply |
| MR00 | by n |
| DSZ GOTO0 | decrements M00 and back to LBL0 until M00=0 |
| = | end of loop, the machine has calculated $1 \times n \times ( n - 1) \times \cdots \times 2 \times 1 =n!$ |

== Interface ==
Casio FA-6
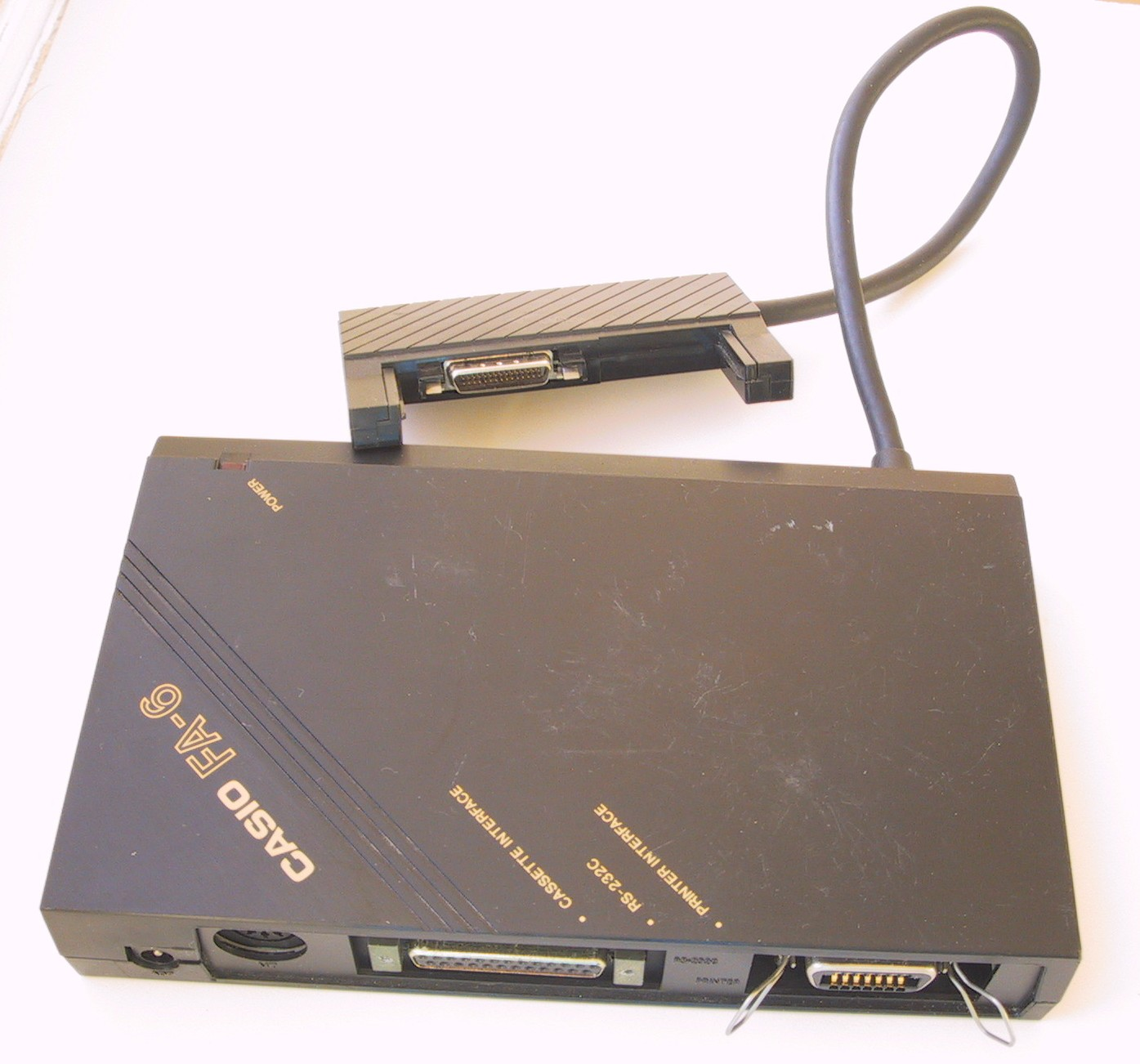
- Connects to: Compact Cassette via one of: Line-Out: 3.5 mm TRS connector; Mic-In: 3.5 mm TRS connector; Tape Start/Stop: 3.5 mm TRS connector; Line Printer via: Centronics printer port; Personal computer via: RS-232C
- Manufacturer: Casio
- Type: Multi Interface

The FX-603P used the same FA-6 interface as used by the Casio FX-840P, Casio FX-841P, Casio FX-850P, Casio FX-860P, Casio FX-860Pvc, Casio FX-870P, Casio FX-880P, Casio FX-890P, Casio VX-1, Casio VX-2, Casio VX-3, Casio VX-4, Casio Z-1 and Casio Z-1GR programmable calculator and pocket computers. This interface features a Kansas City standard Compact Cassette interface, a Centronics printer port and a RS-232 interface.
