= Casio FX-502P series =

Series of programmable calculators produced by Casio

CASIO FX-501P / FX-502P
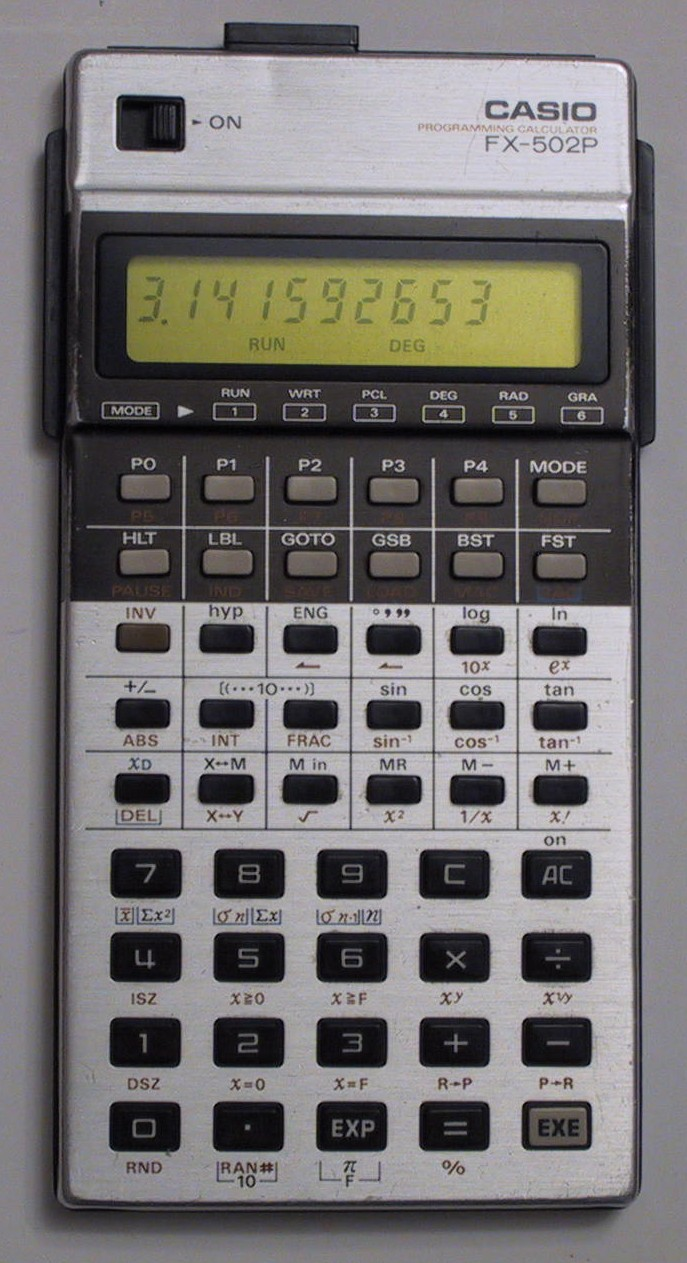
- A 46-year-old FX-502P in working condition
- Type: Programmable scientific
- Manufacturer: Casio
- Introduced: 1978

Calculator
- Entry mode: Infix
- Precision: 12 digits mantissa, ±99 exponent
- Display type: LCD seven-segment display
- Display size: 10 + 3 Digits

Programming
- Programming language(s): Keystroke (fully merged, Turing complete)
- Memory register: 11 (FX-501P), 22 (FX-502P)
- Program steps: 128 (FX-501P), 256 (FX-502P)

Interfaces
- Ports: one vendor specific
- Connects to: Compact Cassette via: FA-1

Other
- Power supply: 2×"G13" or 2×"LR44"
- Power consumption: 0.0008 W
- Weight: 141 g, 5 oz
- Dimensions: 15.24×7.6×1.2 cm, 6"×3"×½"

The FX-501P and FX-502P were programmable calculators, manufactured by Casio from 1978/1979. They were the predecessors of the FX-601P and FX-602P.

It is likely that the FX-501P/502P were the first LCD programmable calculators to be produced as up until 1979 (and the introduction of the HP-41C) no manufacturer had introduced such a device.

== Arithmetic ==
The FX-502P series use algebraic logic as was state-of-the-art at the time.

== Display ==
The FX-501P and FX-502P featured a single line 7-segment liquid crystal display with 10 digits as main display. An additional 3 digits 7-segment display used to display exponents and program steps when entering or debugging programs and 10 status indicators. The display was covered with a yellow filter, supposedly to prevent ultra-violet radiation damage to the unstable (at the time) Liquid Crystal compound.

They were the first Casio calculators to implement engineering notation, and the first calculators in general to implement an engineering notation with shift facility (following Hewlett Packard calculators implementing the first engineering notation in general, and some Commodore and Texas Instruments calculators implementing variable scientific notation with exponent shift facility).

== Programming ==
The programming model employed was key stroke programming by which each key pressed was recorded and later played back. On record multiple key presses were merged into a single programming step. All operations fitted into one program step.

The FX-501P could store 128 steps, with 11 memory registers. The FX-502P had twice that capacity with 256 steps and 22 memory registers.

Conditional and unconditional jumps as well as subroutines were supported. The FX-502P series supported 10 labels for programs and subroutines called P0 .. P9. Each program or subroutine could have up to 10 local labels called LBL0 .. LBL9 for jumps and branches.

The FX-501P and FX-502P supported indirect addressing both for memory access and jumps and therefore the programming model could be considered Turing complete.

Since the FX-501P and FX-502P only employed a seven-segment display each program step was represented by a special 2-digit codes made up of the digits 0 .. 9 and the character C, E, F and P. The calculator came with a special overlay so the user did not need to memorize the mapping between code and actual command.

What differentiated the FX-501 / FX-502P from its competitors was that programming was retained in a battery-buffered memory when the calculator was turned off.

=== Programming example ===
Here is a sample program that computes the factorial of an integer number from 2 to 69. For 5!, the user would type 5 P0 and get the result 120. The whole program is only 9 bytes long.

Key-code	Display-code	Comment
P0	P0	call the program with the P0 key
Min0	C6-00	stores the value in register 0
1	01	starts with 1
LBL0	F0-00	label for the loop
*	E1	multiply
MR0	C7-00	with M0
INV DSZ	FF-01	Decrements M0 and skips next command if M0=Zero
GOTO0	F1-00	Go to LBL0
=	E5	end of loop, the machine has calculated $1 \times n \times ( n - 1) \times \cdots \times 2 \times 1 =n!$

== Interface ==
Casio FA-1
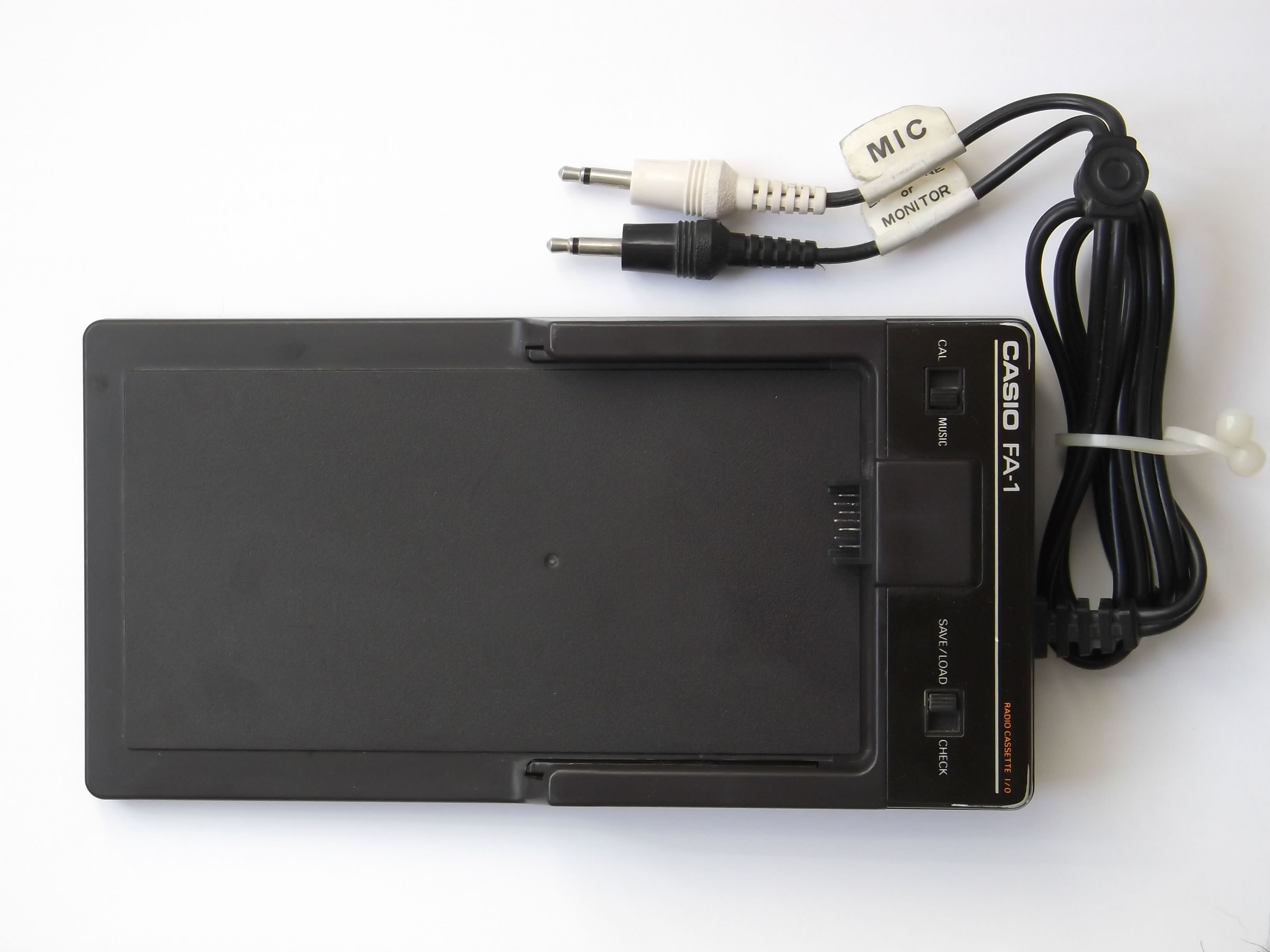
- Connects to: FX-502P series and FX-602P series Compact Cassette via one of: Line-Out: 3.5 mm TRS connector; Mic-In: 3.5 mm TRS connector
- Manufacturer: Casio
- Introduced: 1979
- Type: Compact Cassette Interface

The FX-501P and FX-502P used the FA-1 to store program and data to Compact Cassette using the Kansas City standard. The FA-1 also enabled the calculators to generate musical notes.

The FX-501P was used on the 1981 song "Pocket Calculator" by electronic music group Kraftwerk.
