= Casio FX-702P =

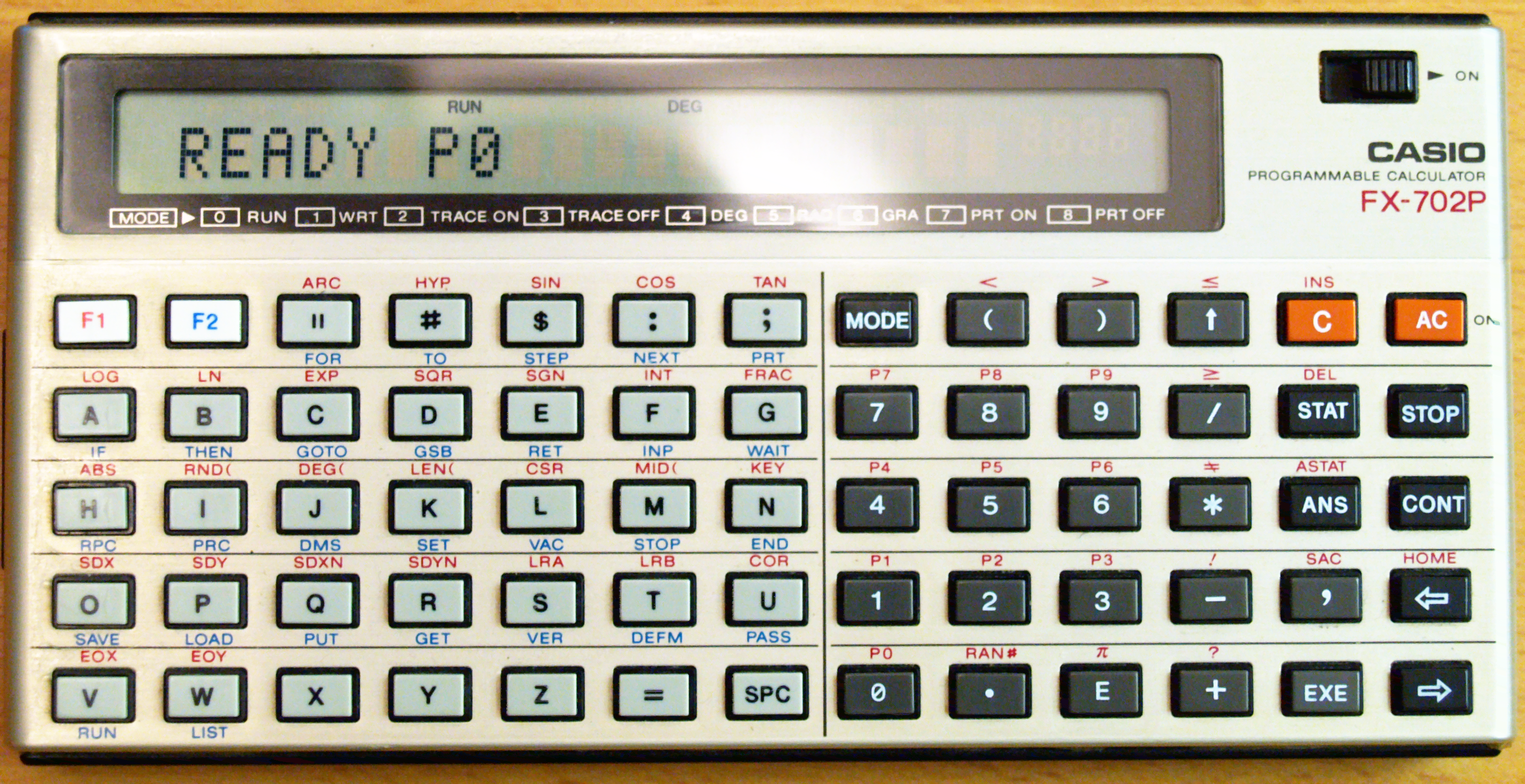
- A 28-year-old FX-702P in working condition
- Type: Pocket Computer
- Manufacturer: Casio
- Introduced: 1981
- Discontinued: 1984

Calculator
- Entry mode: BASIC
- Precision: 12 digit mantissa, ±99 exponent
- Display type: LCD Dot-matrix
- Display size: 20 Characters

CPU
- Processor: CMOS LSI ASIC

Programming
- Programming language(s): BASIC
- User memory: 1,680 bytes

Interfaces
- Ports: one vendor specific
- Connects to: Compact Cassette via: FA-2; Spark printer via one of: Direct; FA-2

Other
- Power supply: 2×CR-2032 Lithium (external power not supported)
- Weight: 176 g. with batteries
- Dimensions: 165W x 82D x 17H mm

The FX-702P is a Pocket Computer, manufactured by Casio from 1981 to 1984.

== Display ==
The FX-702P features a single line dot matrix liquid crystal display with 20 characters. A 10-digit mantissa is displayed (including minus sign) however internal calculations use a 12-digit mantissa.

== Programming ==
The programming model employed is a special BASIC dialect. Ten programming areas are supported, P0 through P9. BASIC lines can be numbered from 1 through to 9999. Subroutines are supported, but passing parameters to subroutines is not supported. The subroutine call stack can be up to 10 deep. Both GOTO lines and subroutines can be addressed indirectly via line number calculation. FOR/NEXT structures can be nested up to eight times.

A single one and/or two dimensional array is supported. However, array memory space must be reserved (subtracted) from the 1,680 character program space via the DEFM command. Array memory can be aliased to fixed variable names, for example A(11) references the same location as variable B1.

Both programs and data can be stored to magnetic tape. Data can be stored under program control. Programs can be password protected from both listing and execution.

== Interface ==
Casio FP-10
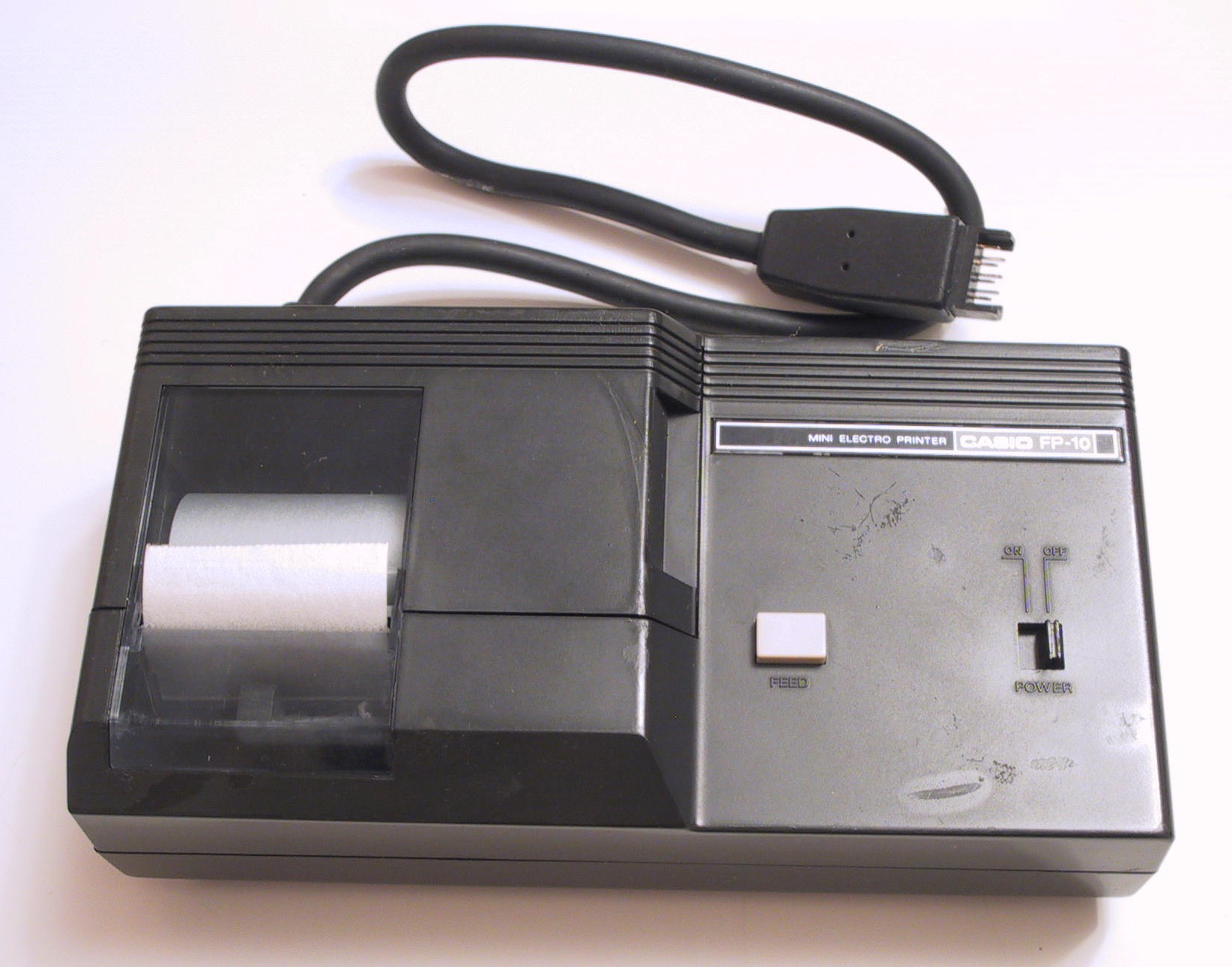
- Connects to: FX-602P series and FX-702P via one of: direct connection; Casio FA-2; optional 6 Volt DC power supply
- Manufacturer: Casio
- Introduced: 1981
- Type: Spark printer
- Weight: 405 g. with batteries
- Dimensions: 156 × 82 × 45 mm

The FX-702P uses the FA-2 interface which is also used by the Casio FX-602P series. The interface features a Kansas City standard Compact Cassette interface and printer port for the FP-10 mini electro printer, also known as a Spark printer. The printer can also be connected directly to the calculator.

The FP-10 Spark printer was used with the FX-602P series of programmable calculator and the FX-702P Pocket Computer to print out programs, data register and display content.
