= ZX Printer =

Spark printer

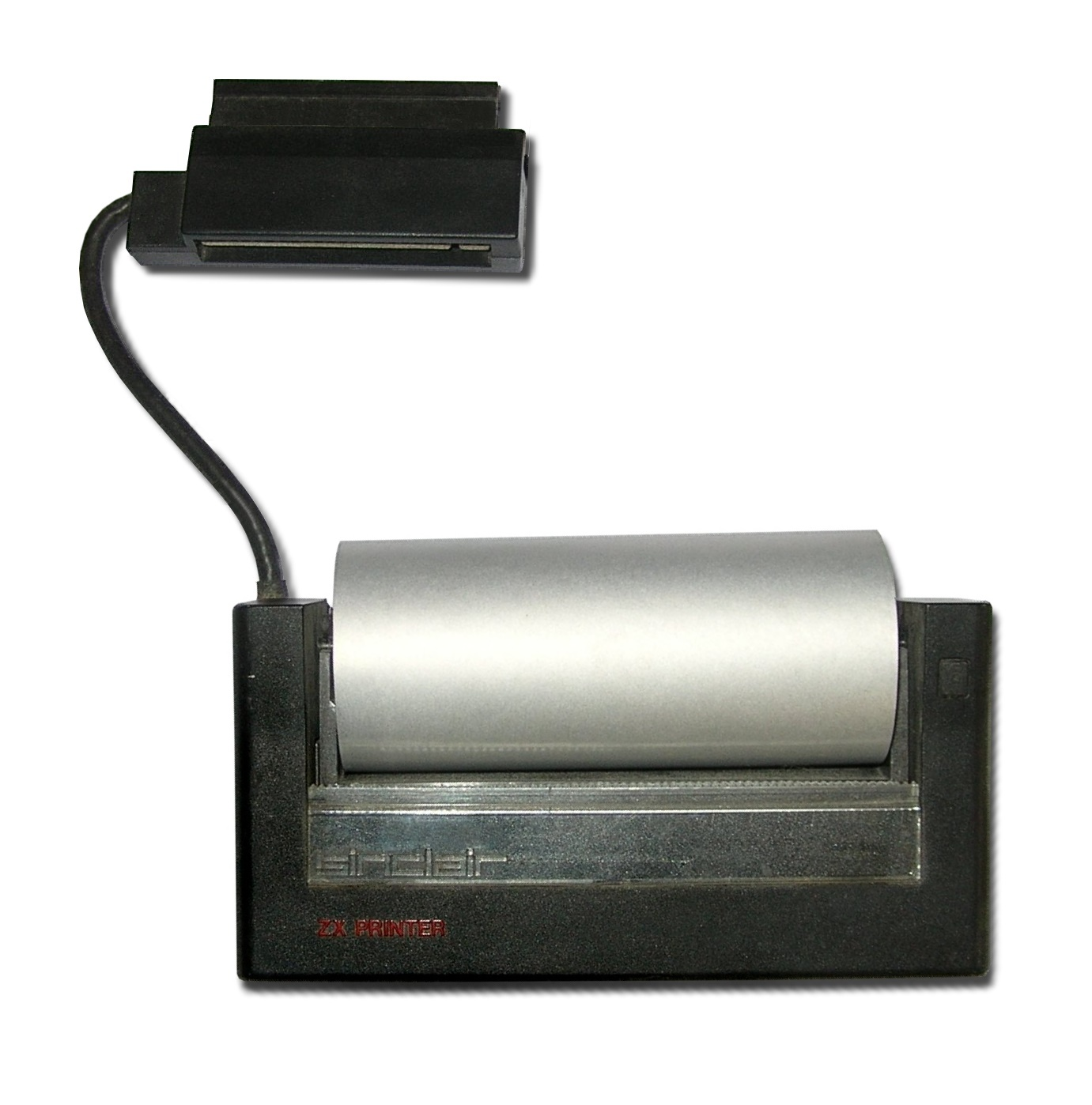
- Manufacturer: Sinclair Research
- Introduced: 1981
- Discontinued: 1984
- Cost: £49.95
- Type: Spark printer

The Sinclair ZX Printer is a spark printer which was produced by Sinclair Research for its ZX81 home computer. It was announced alongside the ZX81 in early 1981, and available later that year with a recommended retail price of £49.95.

The ZX Printer used special 4-inch (100 mm) wide black paper which was supplied coated with a thin layer of aluminium. To mark the paper, one of the printer's two styluses passed a current through a small area of the aluminium layer, causing the aluminium to evaporate and reveal the black under-surface. The printer's horizontal resolution was the same as the ZX81's video display, i.e. 256 dots (pixels) or 32 characters (using the standard character definition).

The ZX Printer was never intended for word processing; the typical use was for program listings and screen shots. It was designed to match the ZX81 by Rick Dickinson, the in-house industrial designer of Sinclair Research Ltd.

The ZX Printer plugged directly into the expansion bus connector via a short cable. The expansion bus was duplicated on the outside of the printer's connector, allowing other peripherals to be connected concurrently. It was also compatible with the earlier ZX80 computer (when fitted with the 8kB ROM upgrade) and with the later ZX Spectrum. The Spectrum's expansion bus was a superset of the ZX81's, so additional Spectrum peripherals would not fit the through-connector. The printer drew its power directly from the expansion bus, and was sold with a larger (1-2A) power supply for the ZX81 to accommodate the additional power drain. The Spectrum's user manual noted that this was not needed for the this computer as its default 1.1A power supply was sufficient.

The peripheral was affectionately referred to during the 1980s by users in the UK home computing community (many of whom were teenagers) as 'The Astronaut's Bog Roll' ('bog roll' being common English vernacular for toilet paper, and the astronaut reference pertaining to the silvery, glittery appearance of the ZX Printer's paper). The printer itself also bore more than a passing resemblance to a 1980s-era toilet-roll dispenser, in terms of its visual design.

After around three years on the market, Sinclair announced the discontinuation of the ZX Printer in mid-1984, citing the fact that by then they were "selling only thousands and sales have fallen", and stating elsewhere that they had no plans to launch a replacement.

== Competing printers ==
=== Alphacom 32 ===
The Alphacom 32 was a thermal printer that used the same interface, and therefore could be driven by a ZX81 or Spectrum without additional software. Unlike the ZX Printer, it had a separate power supply, and made use of standard thermal paper rolls which remain widely available.

=== Timex Sinclair 2040 ===
In the United States, the Alphacom 32 was also rebadged as the official Timex Sinclair 2040 printer for use with their versions of the Sinclair computers. This was done because the original ZX printer did not meet FCC requirements for radio-frequency interference and could not therefore be sold there.

== See also ==
- ZX Spectrum
- Sinclair Research
