= Engineering notation =

Version of scientific notation

Engineering notation or engineering form (also technical notation) is a version of scientific notation in which the exponent of ten is always selected to be divisible by three to match the common metric prefixes, i.e. scientific notation that aligns with powers of a thousand, for example, 531×10^{3} instead of 5.31×10^{5} (but on calculators is often written in E notation – with "E" instead of "×10" to save space) to represent 531,000. As an alternative to writing powers of 10, SI prefixes can be used, which also usually provide steps of a factor of a thousand. (Note: Except in the case of square and cubic units: in this case the SI prefixes provide only steps of a factor of one million or one billion respectively.) On most calculators, engineering notation is called "ENG" mode as scientific notation is denoted SCI.

== History ==
An early implementation of engineering notation in the form of range selection and number display with SI prefixes was introduced in the computerized HP 5360A frequency counter by Hewlett-Packard in 1969.

Based on an idea by Peter D. Dickinson the first calculator to support engineering notation displaying the power-of-ten exponent values was the HP-25 in 1975. It was implemented as a dedicated display mode in addition to scientific notation.

In 1975, Commodore introduced a number of scientific calculators (like the SR4148/SR4148R and SR4190R) providing a variable scientific notation, where pressing the EE↓ and EE↑ keys shifted the exponent and decimal point by ±1 (Note: One exponent shift action would decrease the exponent by the same amount as the decimal point would be moved to the right, so that the value of the displayed number does not change. Preceding the keypress with INV would inverse the action in the other direction.) in scientific notation. Between 1976 and 1980 the same exponent shift facility was also available on some Texas Instruments calculators of the pre-LCD era such as early SR-40, TI-30 and TI-45 model variants utilizing (INV)EE↓ instead. This can be seen as a precursor to a feature implemented on many Casio calculators since 1978/1979 (e.g. in the FX-501P/FX-502P), where number display in engineering notation is available on demand by the single press of a (INV)ENG button (instead of having to activate a dedicated display mode as on most other calculators), and subsequent button presses would shift the exponent and decimal point of the number displayed by ±3 in order to easily let results match a desired prefix. Some graphical calculators (for example the fx-9860G) in the 2000s also support the display of some SI prefixes (f, p, n, μ, m, k, M, G, T, P, E) as suffixes in engineering mode.

== Overview ==
Compared to normalized scientific notation, one disadvantage of using SI prefixes and engineering notation is that significant figures are not always readily apparent when the smallest significant digit or digits are 0. For example, 500 μm and 500×10^{−6} m cannot express the uncertainty distinctions between 5×10^{−4} m, 5.0×10^{−4} m, and 5.00×10^{−4} m. This can be solved by changing the range of the coefficient in front of the power from the common 1–1000 to 0.001–1.0. In some cases this may be suitable; in others it may be impractical. In the previous example, 0.5 mm, 0.50 mm, or 0.500 mm would have been used to show uncertainty and significant figures. It is also common to state the precision explicitly, such as "47 kΩ±5%"

Another example: when the speed of light (exactly 299792458 m/s by the definition of the meter) is expressed as 3.00×10^{8} m/s or 3.00×10^{5} km/s then it is clear that it is between 299500 km/s and 300500 km/s, but when using 300×10^{6} m/s, or 300×10^{3} km/s, 300000 km/s, or the unusual but short 300 Mm/s, this is not clear. A possibility is using 0.300×10^{9} m/s or 0.300 Gm/s.

On the other hand, engineering notation allows the numbers to explicitly match their corresponding SI prefixes, which facilitates reading and oral communication. For example, 12.5×10^{−9} m can be read as "twelve-point-five nanometers" (10^{−9} being nano) and written as 12.5 nm, while its scientific notation equivalent 1.25×10^{−8} m would likely be read out as "one-point-two-five times ten-to-the-negative-eight meters".

Engineering notation, like scientific notation generally, can use the E notation, such that 3.0×10^{−9} can be written as 3.0E−9 or 3.0e−9. The E (or e) should not be confused with the Euler's number e or the symbol for the exa-prefix.

SI prefixes
Prefix		Representations		
Name	Symbol	Base 1000	Base 10	Value
quetta	Q	1000^{10}	10^{30}	1000000000000000000000000000000
ronna	R	1000^{9}	10^{27}	1000000000000000000000000000
yotta	Y	1000^{8}	10^{24}	1000000000000000000000000
zetta	Z	1000^{7}	10^{21}	1000000000000000000000
exa	E	1000^{6}	10^{18}	1000000000000000000
peta	P	1000^{5}	10^{15}	1000000000000000
tera	T	1000^{4}	10^{12}	1000000000000
giga	G	1000^{3}	10^{9}	1000000000
mega	M	1000^{2}	10^{6}	1000000
kilo	k	1000^{1}	10^{3}	1000
		1000^{0}	10^{0}	1
milli	m	1000^{−1}	10^{−3}	0.001
micro	μ	1000^{−2}	10^{−6}	0.000001
nano	n	1000^{−3}	10^{−9}	0.000000001
pico	p	1000^{−4}	10^{−12}	0.000000000001
femto	f	1000^{−5}	10^{−15}	0.000000000000001
atto	a	1000^{−6}	10^{−18}	0.000000000000000001
zepto	z	1000^{−7}	10^{−21}	0.000000000000000000001
yocto	y	1000^{−8}	10^{−24}	0.000000000000000000000001
ronto	r	1000^{−9}	10^{−27}	0.000000000000000000000000001
quecto	q	1000^{−10}	10^{−30}	0.000000000000000000000000000001

== Binary engineering notation ==
Just like decimal engineering notation can be viewed as a base-1000 scientific notation (10^{3} = 1000), binary engineering notation relates to a base-1024 scientific notation (2^{10} = 1024), where the exponent of two must be divisible by ten. This is closely related to the base-2 floating-point representation (B notation) commonly used in computer arithmetic, and the usage of IEC binary prefixes, e.g. 1B10 for 1 × 2^{10}, 1B20 for 1 × 2^{20}, 1B30 for 1 × 2^{30}, 1B40 for 1 × 2^{40} etc.

IEC prefixes
Prefix		Representations		
Name	Symbol	Base 1024	Base 2	Value
quebi (Note: Natural binary counterparts to the ronna- and quetta- decimal prefixes introduced in 2022 were suggested in a consultation paper of the International Committee for Weights and Measures' Consultative Committee for Units (CCU) as robi- (Ri, 1024^{9}) and quebi- (Qi, 1024^{10}). As of 2022, these binary prefixes have not been adopted by the IEC and ISO.)	Qi	1024^{10}	2^{100}	1267650600228229401496703205376
robi	Ri	1024^{9}	2^{90}	1237940039285380274899124224
yobi	Yi	1024^{8}	2^{80}	1208925819614629174706176
zebi	Zi	1024^{7}	2^{70}	1180591620717411303424
exbi	Ei	1024^{6}	2^{60}	1152921504606846976
pebi	Pi	1024^{5}	2^{50}	1125899906842624
tebi	Ti	1024^{4}	2^{40}	1099511627776
gibi	Gi	1024^{3}	2^{30}	1073741824
mebi	Mi	1024^{2}	2^{20}	1048576
kibi	Ki	1024^{1}	2^{10}	1024
		1024^{0}	2^{0}	1

== See also ==
- Significant figures
- Scientific notation
- Binary prefix
- International System of Units (SI)
- RKM code
