= Spark printing =

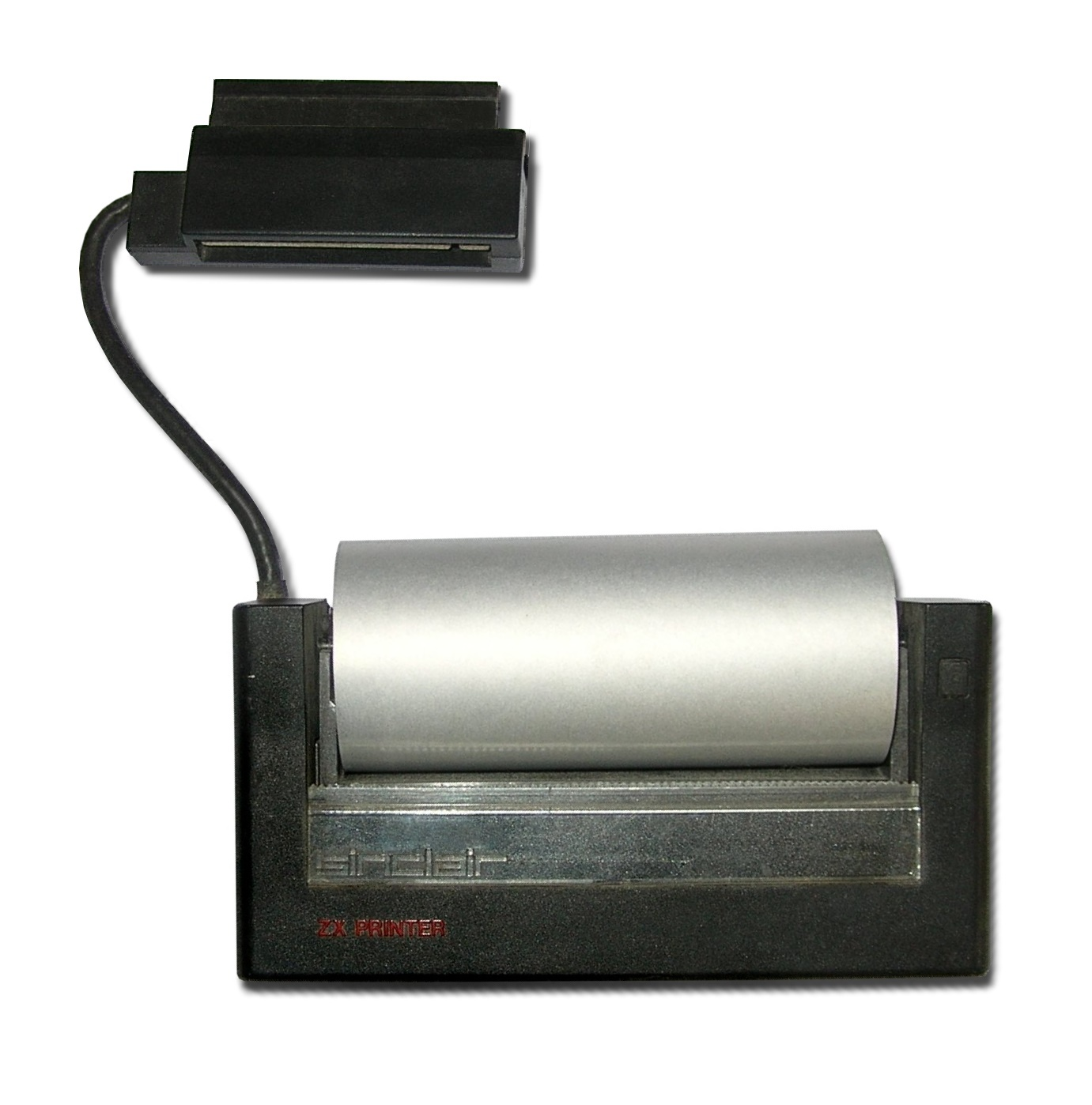
The Sinclair ZX Printer, a small spark printer for the ZX81 and ZX Spectrum computers

Spark printing is an obsolete form of computer printing, before fax and chart recorder printing, which uses a special paper coated with a conductive layer over a contrasting backing, originally black carbon over white paper but later aluminium over black paper. Printing on this paper uses pulses of electric current to burn away spots of the conductive layer. Typically, one or more electrodes are swept across the page perpendicular to the direction of paper motion to form a raster of potential burnt spots.

Western Union developed the paper for this printing technology in the late 1940s, under the trademark "Teledeltos". The Western Union "Deskfax" fax machine, announced in 1948, was one of the first printers to use this technology.

Spark printing was a simple and inexpensive technology. The print quality was relatively poor, but at a time when conventional printers cost hundreds of pounds, spark printers' sub-£100 price was a major selling point. The other major downside is that they can only print onto special metallised paper and such an electrosensitive paper is no longer widely available.

== Models ==
By 1979, the Comprint 912 was widely advertised as being faster, quieter, and less expensive than competitive matrix printers, with its "special aluminized 'silver paper'" being superior to ordinary paper, and "on those rare occasions when you really do need a plain bond paper copy, just run your Comprint 912 printout through your plain bond copy machine and you've got it."

The Sinclair ZX Printer, introduced in November 1981 for the low-end ZX81 (and later for the ZX Spectrum) home computers used the spark printing method, and retailed for £49.95.

In the early 1980s, Casio released a "Mini Electro Printer", the FP-10 for some of their scientific calculators. It used Casio CMP-36x5 paper.

The Hewlett Packard 9120A, which attached to the top of the HP-9100A/B calculator, also used the sparking technique.

Tandy / Radio Shack TRS-80 Screen Printer, Quick Printer, and Quick Printer II all used this same method and special paper.

The Sharp Corporation ELSIMATE EL-8151 portable calculator had a built in spark printer which used silver-colored paper. It is known to be compatible with the Casio CMP-36x5 paper used by the FP-10, despite the Casio paper having a slightly larger core diameter.

== Variants ==
A different spark printer implementation propelled dry toner from a tiny hole in the end of a glass rod, using a high-voltage spark between the platen and print head. The glass toner rod held a solid mass of toner, pushed toward the ejection tip by a spring. This had the advantage of printing onto plain paper, but the disadvantage of the toner not being cured to the paper, and thus easily smudged. Similar to the Sinclair printer, this printer had only one stylus (the toner rod), since the entire plate behind the paper served as the other spark electrode. The printer could only print one line of pixels at a time.
