= Elektronika B3-36 =

Soviet calculator

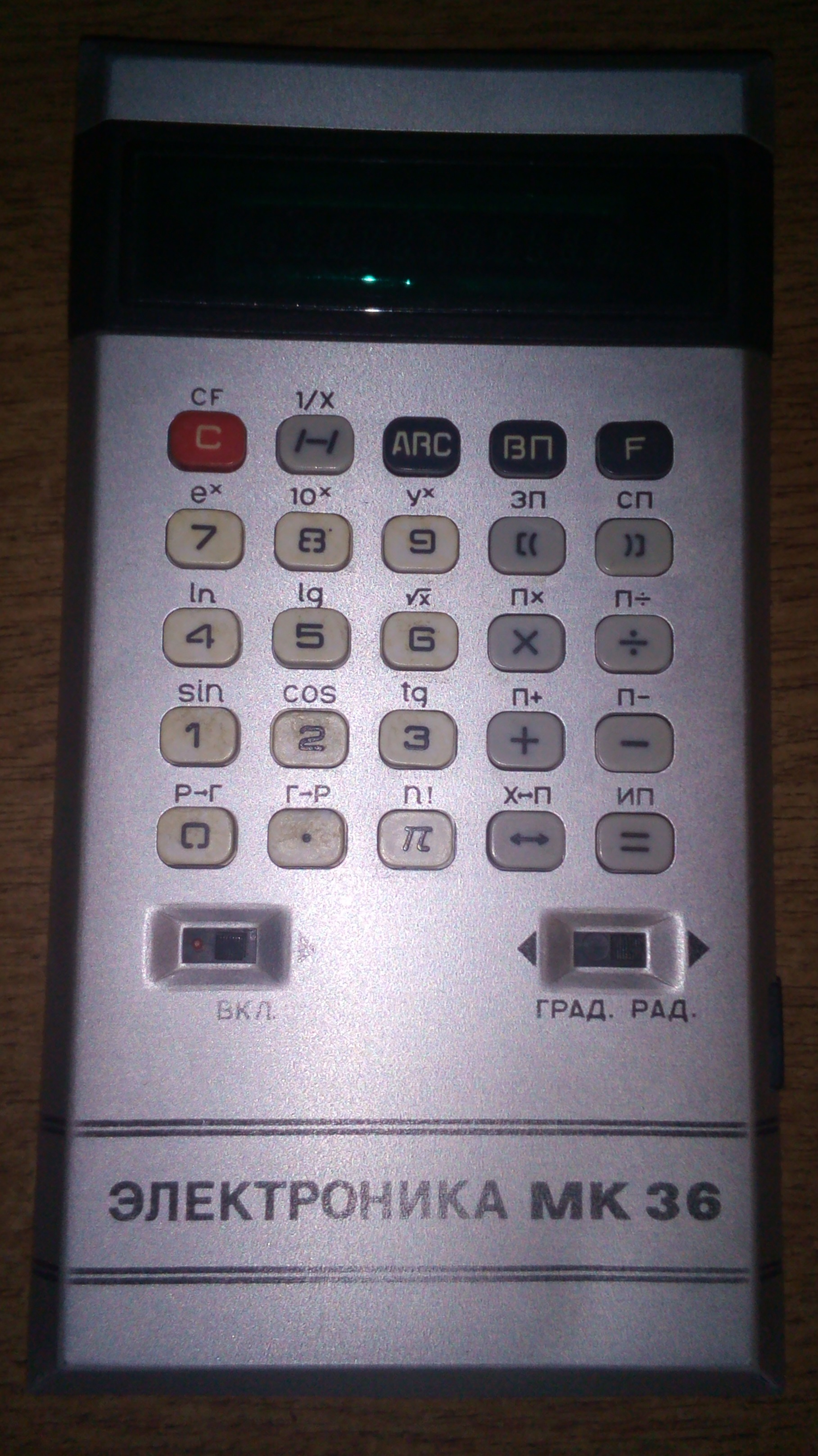
MK-36

Elektronika B3-36 (Russian: Электроника Б3-36), renamed to Elektronika MK-36 later in the production, is a Soviet scientific calculator. It was produced since 1979. It is able to perform four arithmetic operations: calculating natural and decimal logarithms, antilogarithms, direct and inverse trigonometric functions, reciprocals, factorial, perform calculations with two-level brackets, exponentiation, extraction of roots, do basic operations with its memory. Very few changes were made when it was renamed to "Elektronika MK-36" in 1986.

It was designed for scientific calculations and engineering. Elektronika MK-36 is able to operate on either three Д-0,25 Soviet batteries or when connected to the power grid.

== Price ==
The price in the year 1979 was 220 rubles, 120 rubles since 1980, and 70 rubles since December 1981.
