= Elektronika MK-18M =

The Elektronika MK-18M (Russian: Электро́ника МК-18М) was a scientific calculator manufactured in the Soviet Union. It was released in 1986.

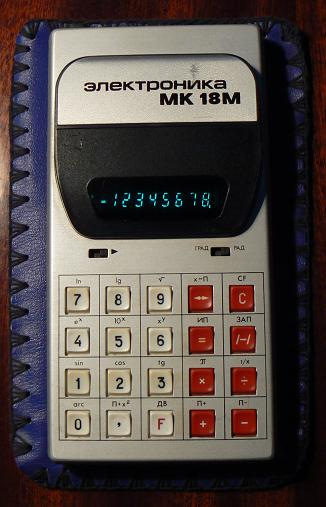

== Technical specifications ==
- Display: vacuum fluorescent display, green color, contains 8 digits + minus sign + error sign
- Power: 4 x AA batteries or AC adapter (with charging function) with 3-pin connector, power consumption ≤0.7W
- 20 buttons
- Case: aluminium + plastic
- Supported numbers range: ±(10E-7)...±(10E8-1)
- Size: 170x86.5x27 mm, weighing around 350 grams

== Novelty ==
The Elektronika MK-18M calculator has no new novel functionality. Despite this, the aluminum casing was an improvement from previous models' plastic casing. In addition, the model was produced at Billur (Kirovograd), in contrast to the Elektronica B3-18 and B3-18A models which were manufactured at Angstrem (Zelenograd) and NPO Elektronika (Boguchar, Voronezh Region).

== See also ==
- Elektronika B3-34
