= Elektronika B3-21 =

First Soviet programmable calculator

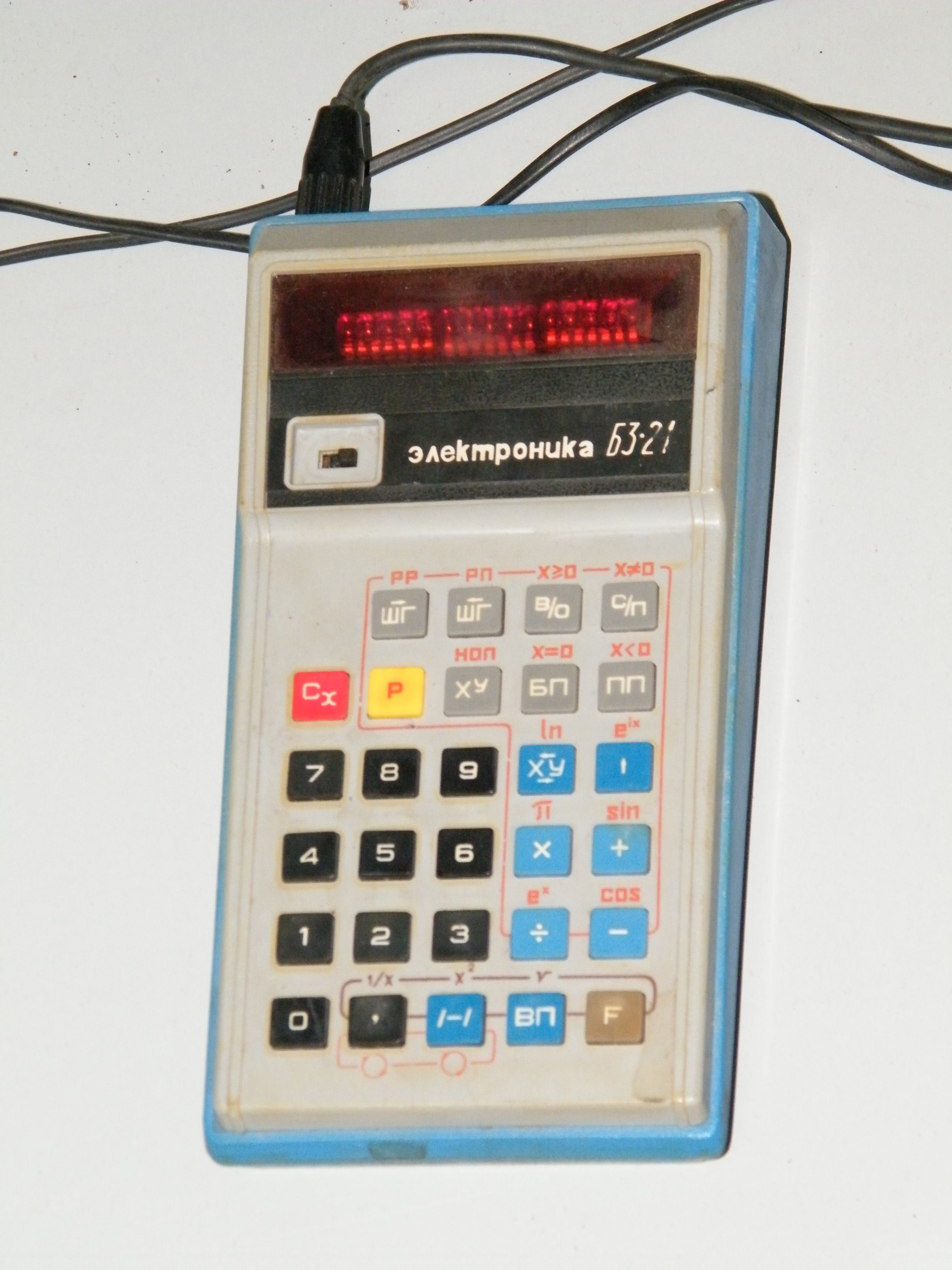
An Elektronika B3-21

Elektronika B3-21 (Cyrillic: Электроника Б3-21) was the first Soviet programmable calculator. It was released in 1977 and was sold initially for 350 rubles (190 in 1980–1981, and just 80 rubles at late 1981). For comparison, 120 rubles was a monthly engineer's salary. Production was stopped in 1982 because of introduction of more advanced Elektronika B3-34.

== Features ==
- Program memory - 60 steps in RAM (no ROM, the code is lost after shut down)
- Data memory - 2 operating registers, 7 additional directly addressed registers, 6 loop stack registers
- Accuracy - 8 digits in the Significand (7 if the value includes decimal dot), 2 exponent digits
- Operations - besides 4 arithmetic ones there were 1/x, x^{2}, x^{y}, sqrt(x), exp(x), ln(x), sin(x), cos(x)
- Conditional and unconditional branching, subroutine calls
- Speed - 3-5 operations (program steps) per second on average (with x^{y} taking the longest time of about 3 seconds)
- Display - red LED seven-segment display, with small lenses in front of each digit (to enlarge the very small LED digits used)
- Powered by disc accumulators (4 * 1.25 volts) or charger

== Derived models ==
- Elektronika MK-46 - desktop version, differed in having 66 steps of program memory, digital inputs for connecting external devices, and output, e.g. for printer (along with functionality to control them).
- Elektronika MK-64 (and later Elektronika MS-1103) - the same as MK-46 but with internal analog-to-digital conversion (ADC) installed so that several analog inputs could be measured (measurements from -9.99 to 9.99 Volts with accuracy of 0.02 Volts).
- Elektronika MK-47 - rare handheld clone of B3-21, allowing the storage of programs on magnetic memory cards.
