= Elektronika MK-61 =

Calculator manufactured in the Soviet Union

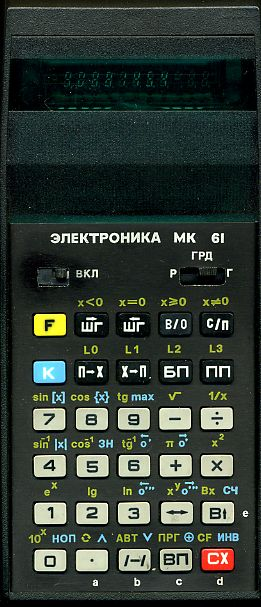
Elektronika MK-61

The Elektronika MK-61 is a third-generation non-BASIC, RPN programmable calculator which was manufactured in the Soviet Union during the years 1983 to 1994. Its original selling price was 85 rubles.

The MK-61 has 105 steps of volatile program memory and 15 memory registers. It functions using either three AA-size battery cells or a wall plug. It has a ten-digit (eight digit mantissa, two digit exponent) green vacuum fluorescent display.

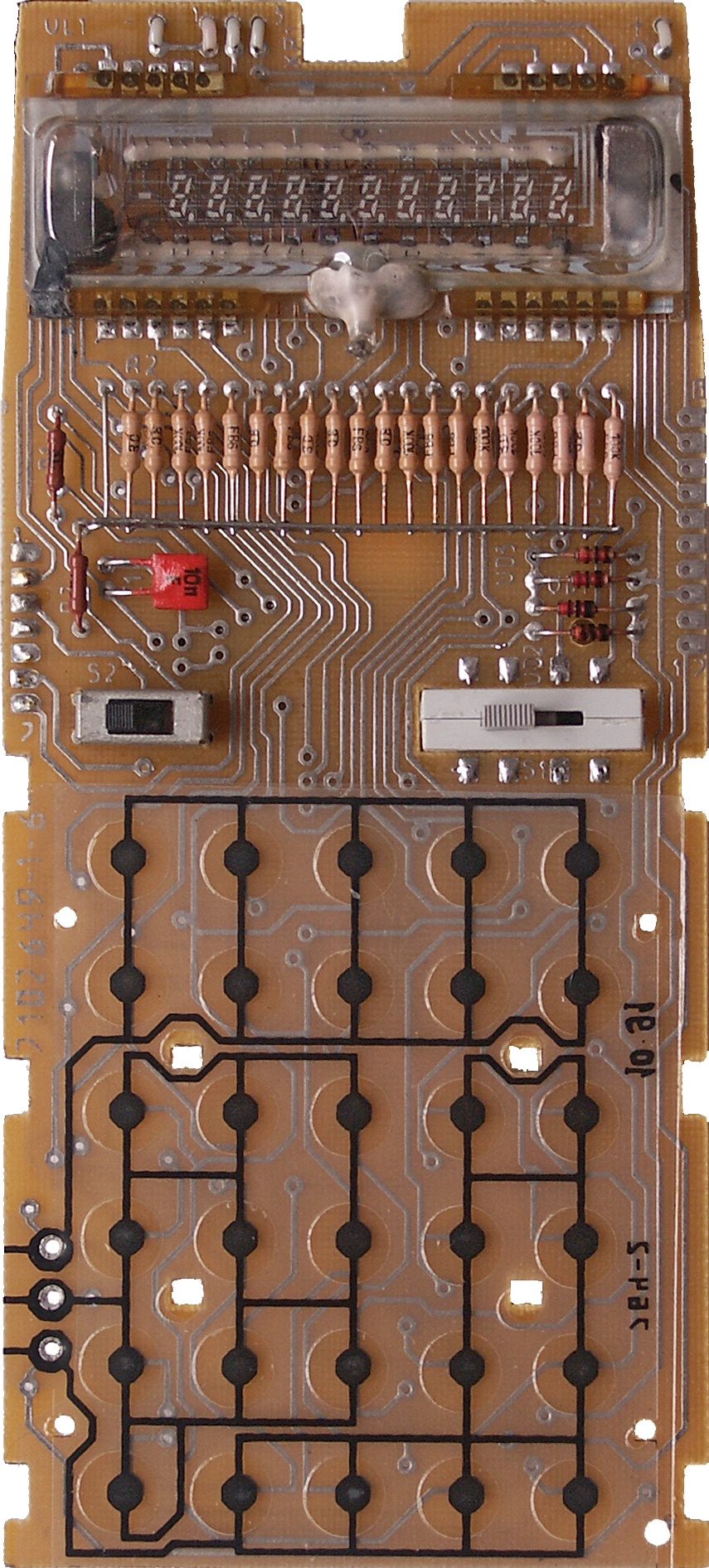

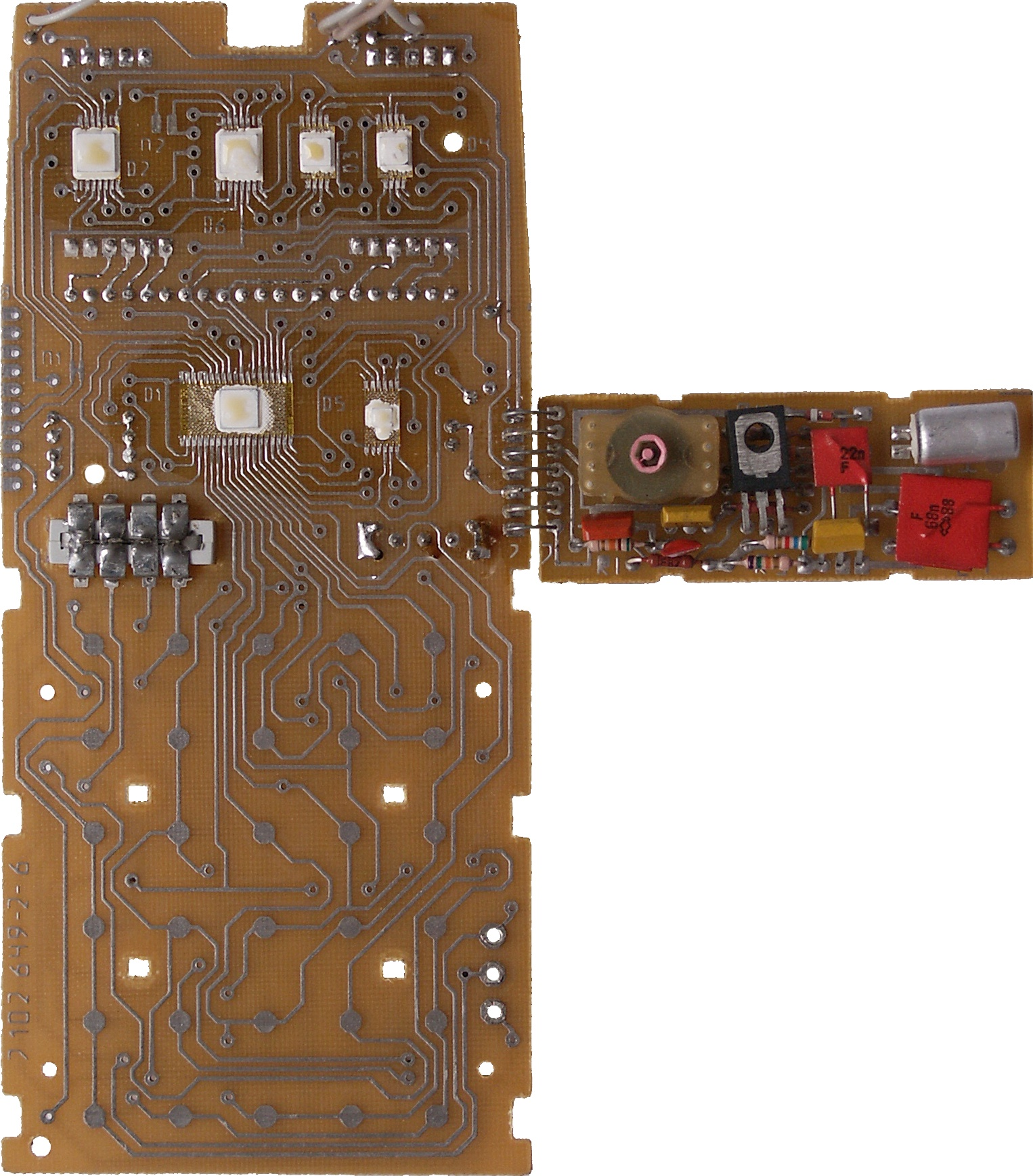

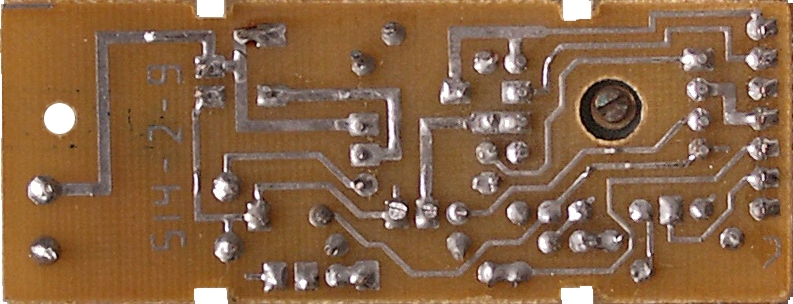

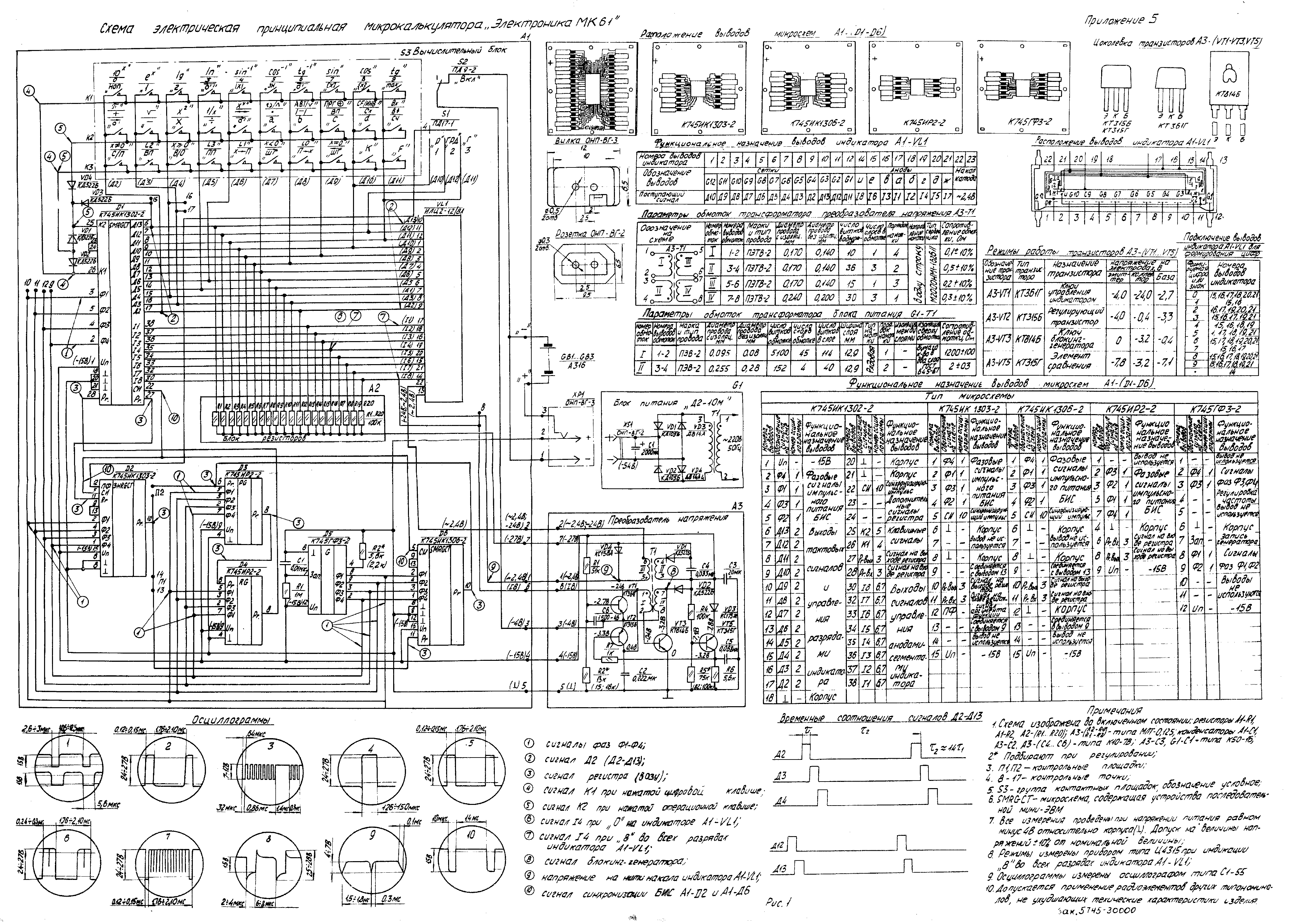
