= Galeb (computer) =

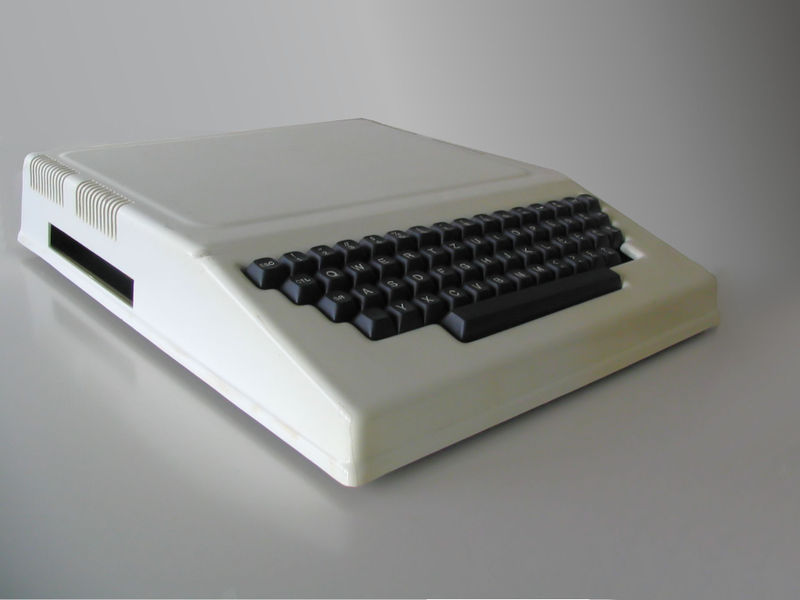
- Also known as: YU 101
- Manufacturer: PEL Varaždin
- Type: Personal Computer
- Released: 1981
- Units sold: 250
- CPU: MOS 6502
- Memory: 9–64 KB RAM + 16 KB ROM
- Display: 96×48, monochrome
- Input: 59 key QWERTZ keyboard
- Successor: Orao
- Related: Compukit UK101

Galeb (lit. 'seagull') was an 8-bit computer developed by the PEL Varaždin company in Yugoslavia in the early 1980s. A grand total of 250 were produced by the end of the summer of 1984, before being replaced with the Orao.

Galeb was designed by Miroslav Kocjan and inspired by Compukit UK101, Ohio Scientific Superboard and Superboard II computers. These machines appeared in the UK and USA in 1979 and were less expensive than Apple II, Commodore PET and/or TRS-80 computers. Galeb's codename YU 101 was chosen to resemble Compukit's UK101.

Galeb was very similar to computers that inspired it:

Specifications:

- CPU: MOS Technology 6502
- ROM: 16 KB (with modified Microsoft BASIC interpreter and Machine code monitor)
- RAM: 9 KB (expandable to 64 KB)
- Keyboard: 59-key QWERTZ
- I/O ports: composite video and RF TV out, cassette tape interface (DIN-5), RS-232 (D-25), edge expansion connector
- Sound: Internal speaker; single-channel, 5 octaves
- Graphics: monochrome, 96 × 48 pixels
- Text mode: 48 x 16 characters
- Price: 90,000 dinars (in 1984)

Emulation of this machine is supported by MESS since 2008 (version 0.124), along with dedicated emulators.
