= Challenger II =

Challenger II may refer to:

- Challenger 2, British main battle tank
- Quad City Challenger II, ultralight aircraft
- Challenger II, a microcomputer manufactured by Ohio Scientific in 1977
- Challenger II, the American registration name for racehorse and leading sire Challenger (horse)
