= Ali Baba and 40 Thieves (video game) =

1982 video game

- Screenshot
- Developer(s): Sega
- Publisher(s): Sega
- Platform(s): Arcade, MSX
- Release: 1982
- Genre(s): Maze
- Mode(s): Single-player, multiplayer

Ali Baba and 40 Thieves is a maze arcade video game released by Sega in 1982. Players take the role of the famous Arabian hero who must fend off and kill the forty thieves who are trying to steal his money. The game is based on the folk tale of the same name. It was ported to the MSX platform, and then a Vector-06C port was made based on the MSX version.

== Legacy ==
A clone for the ZX Spectrum was published by Suzy Soft in 1985 under the name Ali Baba.
