= Suzy Soft =

- Company type: Software publishing subsidiary of Suzy Records
- Industry: Video games
- Founded: 1985
- Defunct: 1988
- Headquarters: Zagreb, SR Croatia, Yugoslavia
- Area served: Yugoslavia
- Parent: Suzy Records
- Website: www.suzy.hr

Suzy Soft was a Yugoslav video game publisher active during the 1980s, operating in Croatia. It started in 1985 as the software division of Suzy Records, based in Zagreb, and published video games and programs for ZX Spectrum, Commodore 64 and Orao by various Yugoslav developers. It was the first Yugoslav company dedicated to software publishing. The house became defunct in 1988, as its parent ditched the software publishing department.

== Software ==
- Ali Baba (1985), by Mario Mandic
- Atomski ratnik
- Bajke (1986), together with Xenon
- Dobro jutro programiranje (1985), by Damir Muraja
- The Drinker (1985), by Saša Pušica
- Flower Man (1988)
- Game Mix (1987)
- Grand Prix ITD BBB
- Jamski Heroj (1987)
- Joe Bankar (1986)
- Ključ (1988), by Saša Požgaj
- Loto 7 od 39 / Loto analiza
- Nevidljivi (Orao, 1988), by Damir Muraja
- Slagalica
- Teatar (illustrated text adventure game, 1986)
- Television
- Velika nevolja
- Vjetrenjača
- Vesoljska zgodba (1985)
- Vruće ljetovanje (1985)
- Zodiak Strip, (1985)
- Western Girl (1988)
