= Vruće Ljetovanje =

1985 video game

Vruće Ljetovanje Vruće Letovanje Vroče Počitnice
- 1985 release cover art
- Publisher: Suzy Soft
- Director: Hrvoje Markulj
- Designer: Ivan Gerenčir
- Programmers: Ivan Gerenčir, Milan Pavićević
- Artist: Igor Kordey
- Writers: Milan Pavićević, Ivan Gerenčir
- Platform: ZX Spectrum
- Release: 1985
- Genre: Adventure
- Mode: Single-player

Vruće Ljetovanje (English: Hot Summer Vacation) is an adventure game published by Suzy Soft for ZX Spectrum in 1985. It was written and developed by Ivan Gerenčir and Milan Pavićević, with graphics done by artist Igor Kordey. The game is notable for being the first Yugoslav adventure game with full color graphics, as well as the first adventure game from Croatia. The game depicts the daily life of Srećko, and his family, who are preparing for a trip to their summer vacation on the coastline, and as such portrays the daily life in the former country. It was published simultaneously in Serbo-Croatian and Slovenian language and retailed at 900 Yugoslav dinars.

== Plot ==
The protagonist, Srećko, lives a daily life with his family in an economically unstable Yugoslavia and is at some point asked by his wife, Milica, to prepare a summer vacation for them to the coastline. He then embarks on an adventure going through daily life attempting to survive and support his family thus running into many obstacles along the way.

== Gameplay ==
First scenes in the Slovenian and Serbo-Croat versions of the game

The game's display is divided in three sections, where the first two sections provide the first-person perspective image of the player's location, with the last third conveying text information such as descriptions, current date and time as well as a console for the player to give commands.

The gameplay is based on real-time method, the plot features 13 major autonomous NPCs which move from one area to another depending on time, and an open world, aspects already established in previous adventure games. It also introduces hunger and fatigue as parameters which greatly affect the player potentially resulting in his death. These factors also depend on each other, for instance "run to the store before it closes to get food so you don't starve to death, but your fatigue prevents you from running". The player can travel both by foot or by car.

Financial planning of food, car gas, gifts and vacation is also mandatory for the player's progression, as it could end the game through bankruptcy. You get several sources of income (piggy bank, monthly salary, savings etc.) which you need to spend during the course of the adventure without fully depleting it.

== Reception ==
It was praised by the Slovenian computer magazine Moj mikro as easily one of the better Yugoslavian programs in its November issue. Another prominent magazine Svet Kompjutera, favourably compared it to other games of the genre such as The Hobbit, Sherlock, and Eric, even praising it as having better and more humorous solutions than the aforementioned games. It particularly noted its very fast routine for image display and the large span of words that could be used during play.
