= Mini-Micro Systems =

Defunct magazine

Mini-Micro Systems was a monthly computer industry trade magazine published by Cahners Publishing.

== History ==
The magazine's Mini-Micro Systems title originated in 1976; previously it was named Modern Data. Some of their material was picked up by other computer periodicals. Publication of Mini-Micro ceased in 1989.

When computer periodicals were more numerous, The New York Times noted that the 1968-originated Modern Data title benefited from both a change in title and that they successfully "homed in exclusively on the mushrooming small computer field."
