= Ohio Scientific =

Early microcomputer company

Ohio Scientific, Inc.
- Formerly: Ohio Scientific Instruments, Inc. (1975–1979); M/A-COM Office Systems, Inc. (1981–1983)
- Type: Private
- Industry: Computer
- Founded: 1975; 51 years ago in Hiram, Ohio
- Founders: Michael Cheiky; Charity Cheiky; Dale Dreisbach
- Defunct: December 1983; 42 years ago
- Fate: Acquired by M/A-COM in 1980; later sold to Kendata in early 1983, then Isotron, Inc. (AB Fannyudde), in late 1983, then Dataindustrier AB in 1986
- Headquarters: Aurora, Ohio, United States
- Products: See § Products
- Number of employees: 300 (1980, peak)
- Parent: M/A-COM (1981–1983); Kendata (1983); Isotron, Inc. (1983–1986)

Ohio Scientific, Inc. (OSI, originally Ohio Scientific Instruments, Inc.), was a privately owned American computer company based in the Akron metropolitan area that built and marketed computer systems, expansions, and software from 1975 to 1986. Their best-known products were the Challenger series of microcomputers and Superboard single-board computers. The company was the first to market microcomputers with hard disk drives in 1977.

The company was incorporated as Ohio Scientific Instruments in Hiram, Ohio, by husband and wife Mike and Charity Cheiky and business associate Dale A. Dreisbach in 1975. Originally a maker of electronic teaching aids, the company leaned quickly into microcomputer production, after their original educational products failed in the marketplace while their computer-oriented products sparked high interest in the hobbyist community. The company moved to Aurora, Ohio, occupying a 72,000-square-foot factory. The company reached the $1 million revenue mark in 1976; by the end of 1980, the company generated $18 million in revenue. Ohio Scientific's manufacturing presence likewise expanded into greater Northeastern Ohio as well as California and Puerto Rico.

In 1980, the company was acquired by telecommunications conglomerate M/A-COM of Burlington, Massachusetts, for $5 million. M/A-COM soon consolidated the company's product lines, in order to focus their new subsidiary on manufacturing business systems. During their tenure under M/A-COM, Ohio Scientific was renamed M/A-COM Office Systems. M/A-COM struggled financially themselves and sold the division in 1983 to Kendata Inc. of Trumbull, Connecticut, who immediately renamed it back to Ohio Scientific. Kendata, previously only a corporate reseller of computer systems, failed to maintain Ohio Scientific's manufacturing lines and subsequently sold the division to AB Fannyudde of Sweden. The flagship Aurora factory, by then only employing 16 people, was finally shut down in October 1983.

== Beginnings (1975–1976) ==
Co-founders Mike and Charity Cheiky pictured in 1978 with a Challenger 2P

Ohio Scientific was founded in Hiram, Ohio, in 1975 by Dale A. Dreisbach (c. 1909 – June 16, 1987) and husband and wife Michael "Mike" Cheiky (January 1, 1952 – December 7, 2017) and Charity Cheiky (born c. 1954). Mike Cheiky had worked at the Solon-based Ohio Nuclear Company—makers of medical equipment—as director of engineering, while Charity Cheiky had been employed at Western Reserve Academy as a professor of math and computer science. Dreisbach meanwhile was a chairman and professor emeritus of Hiram College's chemistry department; the Cheikys had met at Hiram College. The three founded Ohio Scientific with between $5,000 and $25,000 of start-up capital.

The company was originally outfitted from the Cheiky's garage and was dedicated to the production of electronic teaching aids. The company's original name—Ohio Scientific Instruments, Inc.—reflected this initial purpose. The first products the company released included a calculator that also taught the basics of statistics and a single-board microcomputer. The latter, called the Microcomputer Trainer Board and incorporating a MOS Technology 6502 microprocessor, was designed by Mike, inspired by his experience with microprocessor-based minicomputers at his Ohio Nuclear job.

Most of the educational products sold poorly due to the lack of a strong local market for them, according to Mike. However, the Microcomputer Trainer Board saw high demand. Most fruitful was a quarter-page advertisement in an early issue of Byte—a magazine for microcomputer hobbyists—with orders for the board totaling $100,000 within a few months. The board generated $20,000 in sales for the trio, much more than they had originally anticipated. To keep up with growth, Cheikys moved the company to a 700-square-foot storefront in Hiram, Ohio, last occupied by a barbershop and right next to a pizza parlor.

== Growth (1976–1980) ==
With the release of their microcomputer systems and hardware in the mid-1970s, Charity Cheiky became the first woman at the helm of a personal computer manufacturer. In June 1976, Ohio Scientific had logged their first $1 million in revenue. In late January 1978, the company moved from Hiram to Aurora, Ohio, occupying a 72,000-square-foot factory formerly occupied by Custom Beverage. By that point, the company had employed 35. Within six months, the number of employees had reached 100. Cash flow increased in tandem: between 1977 and 1978, the company grossed $10 million, and between 1978 and 1980, it logged sales of $20 million. In 1980, Ohio Scientific generated $18 million in revenues — $14.8 million between January and October 1980 and $3.2 million to the end of the year.

The Cheikys meanwhile felt that Ohio Scientific was growing too fast for them to adequately manage. Stan Veit, a business partner of Ohio Scientific as well as the founder of the first computer store in New York City, called the company poorly organized and hard to contact. In his words, the company was "undercapitalized and very slow to deliver ordered equipment. This lost them a lot of the business they could have obtained because of their technical ability". In order to appease chagrined dealers who complained of long development times for the company's software, Ohio Scientific initiated a cooperative centralized software dealership program to spur the development of business applications for their computers in late 1978.

In 1980, the company opened up two facilities in Cleveland: the first, a manufacturing plant early in the year; and the second, a 15,000-square-foot salesman training center opened in fall 1980. Ohio Scientific additionally opened a printed circuit board manufacturing plant in Puerto Rico around the time of their expansion into Cleveland, incorporating Ohio Scientific of Puerto Rico, Inc., in the process. In November 1980, the company acquired the hard drive manufacturing division of Okidata in Goleta, California, which manufactured the company's C-D74 drives that were used with their Challenger series of microcomputers. After acquiring the division, Ohio Scientific folded it into their wholly owned Ohio Scientific Memory Products division. By 1980, Ohio Scientific had 300 employees overall.

== Sale (1980–1983) ==
Despite the software dealership initiative and the growing backbone of their manufacturing prowess, Ohio Scientific was never fully able to shake off their problems with software delivery. Still wanting an out, the Cheikys contacted a business friend, who got them in contact with M/A-COM, a telecommunications conglomerate based in Burlington, Massachusetts. After discussion, M/A-COM agreed to acquire Ohio Scientific, publicly announcing their intent to purchase the company in November 1980. M/A-COM had recently absorbed Linkabit, a technology company of San Diego, California, in 1979. The terms of Ohio Scientific's sale were initially undisclosed, later revealed to be $5 million in cash. The Cheikys pocketed $3 million, while Dreisbach received the rest. The acquisition was finalized in mid-December, underwritten by McDonald & Co. of Cleveland. M/A-COM's decision to acquire a computer systems company surprised some in the telecommunications industry, but Irwin M. Jacobs, president of M/A-COM, stated it was contingent with their push to supply offices with complete and comprehensive communications systems.

M/A-COM acquired all of Ohio Scientific's facilities, including those in Ohio, California, and Puerto Rico. The Cheikys were briefly assigned advisor status in the company, but they were demoted, according to Charity, because M/A-COM disagreed with their guidance. Instead, Harvey P. White replaced them as head of the subsidiary in December 1980. White left Ohio Scientific to helm M/A-COM's Linkabit subsidiary in July 1981. Doug Hajjar was named as interim president before being replaced by William Chalmers later in the month. Chalmers beat out Chuck Kempton, a newly appointed marketing vice-president poached from Wang Laboratories, for the position.

The not-so-smooth acquisition of OSI has, within a year, virtually transformed the company, through M/A-COM resources, from a shoe-string, technical-product operation offering little documentation and support, into a $500-million company focusing on full solutions for users.

— Mini-Micro Systems, January 1982

Under ownership of M/A-COM in 1981, Ohio Scientific saw a drastic transformation in culture and corporate operations. While the company still operated as a subsidiary from its original headquarters in Aurora, the employees there soon became relegated to the status of a "support engineering group". The bulk of the subsidiary's research and development meanwhile was relocated to Burlington in early 1982. A second research facility was also opened up in California—with Mike Cheiky named head of this—while Chalmers relocated from Aurora to Burlington. In December 1981, the subsidiary changed its name to M/A-COM Office Systems, Inc., reflecting these changes. Chalmers explained in 1982: "This is not an Ohio or a scientific company any more". Massive consolidation of Ohio Scientific's 110 hardware and software products also occurred in 1982. The division was down to seven unique business systems that year (with optional configurations for each). Further computer systems would be based on the Intel 8088 processor and were slated to be installed with CP/M-86.

== Demise (1983) ==
In August 1982, M/A-COM announced their intention to divest M/A-COM Office Systems by the end of the year. Spokespersons for the parent company cited M/A-COM's decision to refocus on high-speed digital communications, as well as higher-than-expect costs of developing hardware and software for general-purpose computer systems. M/A-COM was additionally suffering from large losses in the year to that point.

In February 1983, Kendata Inc. of Trumbull, Connecticut, was named as M/A-COM Office Systems' buyer. A corporate reseller of Victor computers, Kendata was one of two companies in talks with M/A-COM to acquire the division in 1982. The first order of business for Kendata was restoring the subsidiary's name back to Ohio Scientific, in order to take advantage of its existing brand presence. Kendata soon found themselves struggling to manage Ohio Scientific due a lack of technical and manufacturing prowess, however, as well as dealing with stiff competition from IBM and Tandy Corporation. On October 3, 1983, Ohio Scientific's Aurora's factory was shut down, and the inventory liquidated, after Kendata had foreclosed on the property. The factory's 16 remaining employees were simultaneously let go. Locals lamented the closure of Ohio Scientific as the end of the high-tech industry for Aurora.

Kendata sold the remaining assets of Ohio Scientific to AB Fannyudde of Sweden in December 1983. The latter absorbed Ohio Scientific under their Isotron, Inc., subsidiary. Ohio Scientific continued as a second-order subsidiary under Isotron until 1986, when Dataindustrier AB (DIAB) acquired Isotron from Fannyudde in 1986.

== Products ==
=== Model 300 Computer Trainer Board (1976) ===
Ohio Scientific are best remembered for their Superboard and Challenger lines, single-board and fully encased microcomputer systems respectively. The first Superboards were first announced in the December 1975 issue Byte. Announced later, but probably preceding the first Superboards in production, was the Model 300 Computer Trainer Board, which features an MOS Technology 6502 microprocessor and 128 bytes of RAM. The board is 8 by 10 inches (20 by 25 cm) and requires an external 5 V DC, 500 mA power source. In a design scheme similar to a number of trainer boards of its contemporary, a number of slide switches on the bottom of the board connect directly to the MOS 6502's data, read–write, and address select pins, allowing the microprocessor to be halted and the RAM loaded with machine code instructions. A row of LEDs connected in series with each line of the 6502's bus acts as a visual representation of the state of the processor. Ohio Scientific fully assembled each Computer Trainer Board, which came shipped with a manual; optional was a power supply and hardware and programming monographs.

=== Model 400 Superboard (1976) ===
In September 1976, the company announced the Model 400 Superboard, a DIY kit which in fully assembled form runs either the MOS 6502, the MOS 6501, or the Motorola 6800 microprocessors. The Model 400 Superboard has a 48-line-wide bus at its edge, allowing it to be slotted into a backplane and take advantage of a number of expansion and peripheral boards, including the Model 420 memory expansion board, the Model 430 Super I/O board, and the Model 440 Super Video graphics board. The Model 400 can be outfit with up to 1 kB of RAM, 512 Bytes of ROM, an ACIA chip for implementing RS-232 or 4–20 mA loop interfaces for serial communication, and a peripheral device adapter with 16 I/O lines. It was built from G-10 fiberglass laminate and measures 8 by 10 inches (20 by 25 cm). The 430 Super I/O board provides two 8-bit DACs, one 8-bit ADC, an 8-bit parallel port, and a number of serial interfaces for terminal and teletype interaction and data storage, including Baudot, ASCII, FSK, and Kansas City standard. Ohio Scientific offered both units on a rental basis in 1977, as part of their "315 plan", wherein users were given the Model 300 Trainer for two months, then are given the Model 400, 430, 440 boards, a keyboard, a data cassette interface, and documentation, once the Model 300 was returned.

In August 1977, Ohio Scientific released the OSI 460Z. This was a multiprocessor expansion board kit for the Model 400 Superboard that greatly expands its software library by supporting several different kinds of microprocessors, including the Intersil 6100 (a microprocessor-based implementation of DEC's PDP-8 minicomputer) and the Zilog Z80 (which is software-compatible with the Intel 8080 by design). The 460Z supports only Model 400s running the 6502 but allows the latter to fully control the 460Z, including accessing each line of the 6100 and Z80 and setting those processors in either single-stepping mode or full-speed operation. The Model 400 with the Model 460Z can execute code for multiple architectures by interrupts triggered for the 6502 to relinquish control to the secondary processors, and vice versa. The 6502 can execute code for itself while the other processors are busy, allowing for true multiprocessing. With the 460Z installed on bus, the Model 400 can address other cards only by mapping a 4-KB "porthole" through the 460Z's address space.

=== Challenger I (1976) ===
Ohio Scientific's first Challenger computer system, retrospectively called the Challenger I, was introduced in around November 1976. Billed as a tabletop computer, the Challenger I borrowed much of its circuitry from the Superboards sold alongside it, but it has a special 48-pin S-100 bus for expansion which makes use of non-standard Molex connectors, ostensibly an attempt at making the contacts more reliable. The Challenger I has four of these special S-100-bus expansion slots. Jeffrey Beamsley of Micro magazine describes the bus as such:

The 48-pin Ohio Scientific bus is really a model of efficiency. It is made up of four 12-pin Molex-type connectors. Of these 48 pins, only 42 are defined, leaving 6 available for future expansion. The defined pins on the bus include 20 address lines, 6 power lines, 8 data lines, and 8 control lines. The bus supports distributed, fully regulated DC power. The placement of the power lines causes dead shorts on the bus for any board improperly inserted. The Ohio Scientific bus was one of the first microprocessor busses to support bi-directional data lines. It is passively terminated and probably has a bandwidth of 5 MHz. It is very inexpensive as far as bus structures are concerned and is classed by Ohio Scientific as proprietary.

As stock, the Challenger came with a 1-MHz MOS 6502A microprocessor; optional were a 4-MHz MOS 6502C and a Motorola 6800. The base configuration of the Challenger I contains 1 KB of RAM and 1 KB of PROM; it can support up to 192 KB and 16 KB of each respectively.

If purchased with 4 KB of PROM, Ohio Scientific included a free roll of Microsoft BASIC on paper tape. The Challenger I comes with a bootstrap loader built in to the machine that reads from paper tape readers such as that built into the Teletype Model 33, which it also supports as a terminal interface due to its inclusion of an ACIA; alternatively a video terminal can be used. By mid-1977 a medley of expansion cards and peripherals were available from Ohio Scientific for the Challenger I, including a single or dual floppy disk drives (manufactured by GSI in California), a cassette drive and interface, a video card, and an external keyboard. In January 1978, Ohio Scientific began the Challenger I as part of an integrated bundle, including a custom video terminal using a Sanyo-manufactured CRT, a rebranded GSI 110 single floppy drive, and one of two Okidata dot-matrix printers. Kilobaud Microcomputing called the Challenger I "the first fully assembled mainframe computer which is priced competitively with hobby kits".

=== Ohio Scientific Model 500 (1977) ===
The Ohio Scientific Model 500—available as either a single-board computer, as a small-form-factor desktop computer (as the Model 500-1), or as a keyboard computer (as the Model 500-8)—was announced in July 1977. Running a 1-MHz MOS 6502 microprocessor, the Model 500 supports up to 4 kB of RAM and comes with a 750-byte PROM chip containing one of two machine code monitors and four ROM sockets supporting up to 8 KB worth of chips. The four 2-KB ROM chips included with the stock Model 500 were manufactured by Signetics and contain Microsoft's official BASIC interpreter, occupying all 8 KB of ROM. The Model 500 also has a buffered expansion bus and an Motorola 6850 UART for RS-232 and current-loop serial communications. The Model 500-1's case measured 12 by 15 by 4 inches (30 by 38 by 10 cm), while the Model 500-8's measured 15 by 17 by 10 inches (38 by 43 by 25 cm).

The Model 500 came fully assembled and was interoperable with Ohio Scientific's Model 400 system of peripherals using that computer's backplane, including the Model 440 Super Video board. One of two machine code monitors were supplied: one configured for the Model 500 as used with a terminal for video output, and the other for the computer as used with the Model 440 Super Video board. Writing in Kilobaud Microcomputing, F. R. Ruckdeschel called the Model 500 very cost competitive with the "1977 Trinity" of the Apple II, Commodore PET, and TRS-80, given that it included Microsoft BASIC like those systems while costing an order of magnitude less. However, he deemed it "not an 'appliance' computer, but [an] interesting basic microcomputer for the hobbyist", due to the level of involvement needed in setting it up.

=== Challenger II, 2P (1977) ===
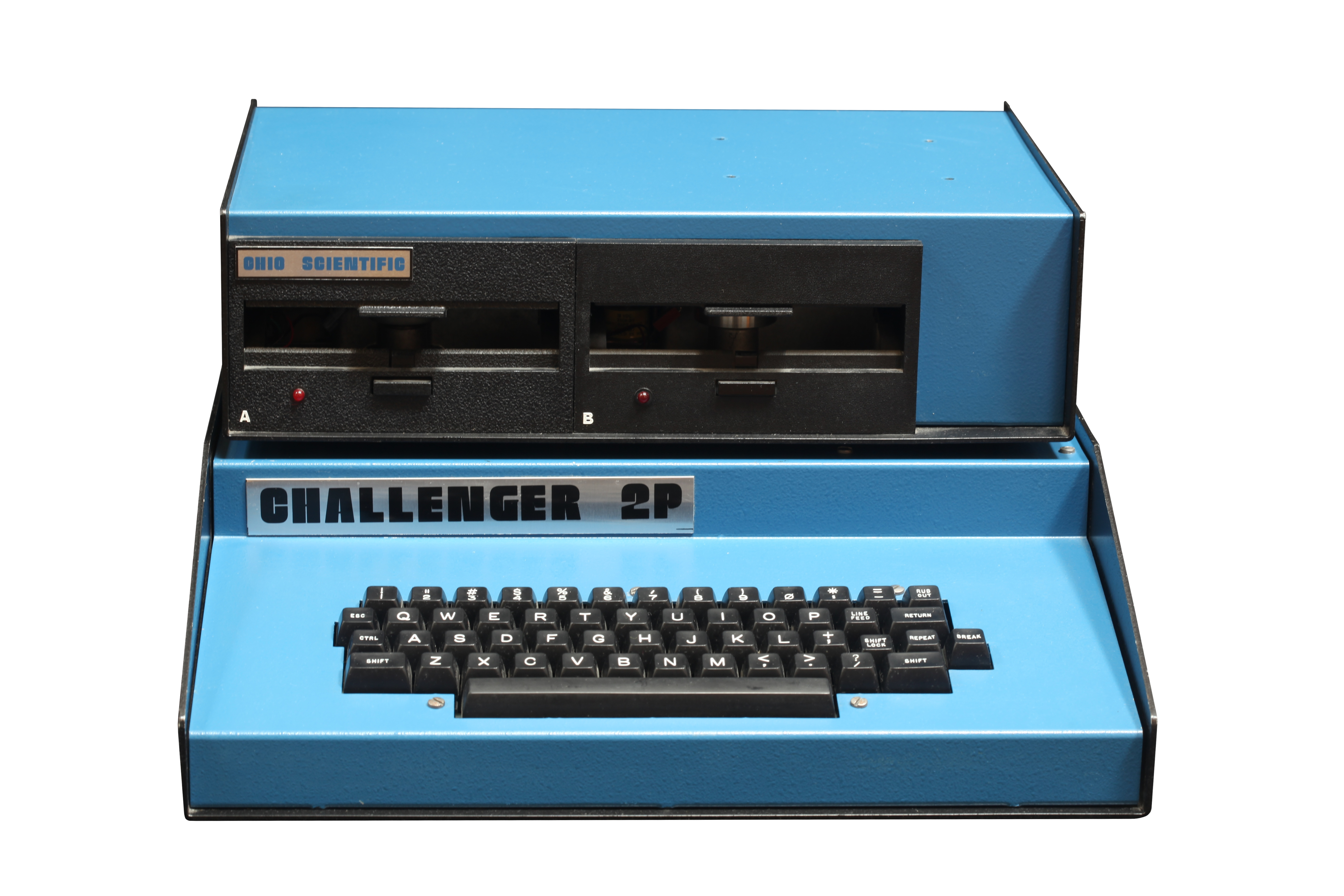
Challenger IIP, with optional dual floppy drive unit

The Challenger II series, first released in 1977, was offered in a variety of form factors and variants. The first two models, the Challenger II (model number IIV, later C2-S2) and the Challenger IIP, were based on Ohio Scientific's Model 500 single-board computer. The Challenger IIP (also rendered as 2P) has a 2-MHz MOS 6502A, while the Challenger II proper has only a 1-MHz 6502. The Challenger IIP has an integral keyboard and RF video output board but only four of Ohio Scientific's semi-proprietary S-100 expansion bus slots. The II proper meanwhile has eight such S-100 slots but lacks a keyboard or video output—relying on a terminal for interaction—and is built into a desktop form factor. The II proper also lacks a built-in cassette interface, unlike the IIP. Both Challengers came shipped with Microsoft BASIC (the IIP's was included in ROM), had 4 KB of RAM, and were compatible with all Challenger I software. A later variant of the II proper includes the built-in cassette interface and video board of the IIP and came shipped with an external full-sized keyboard.

Video output of the IIP is limited to text, 32 rows of 64 characters, over the RF jack. However, rudimentary graphics can be drawn using 170 special characters in the character generator's code page; characters are also redesignable, for more elaborate custom graphics. Ohio Scientific began selling Challenger 2P's integral video board as a standalone unit for any Challenger system in May 1978, dubbing it the Model 540 video board.

In November 1977, Ohio Scientific unveiled the C-D74. This was an external hard drive unit that used a 14-inch 74-MB hard disk drive sourced from Okidata. A Winchester-style hard disk drive, it was the first such drive with 12 tracks per cylinder, no head reseeking needed. Ohio Scientific quoted a data transfer rate of 7.3 Mbit/s, an access time of 5 ms, a single-track seek time of 10 ms, and an average random seek time of 35 ms. The drive was meant specifically for the company's Challenger line and came shipped with the company's OS-74 operating system, an interface card fitting the company's semi-proprietary S-100 slot, and a cable to connect the drive to said card. Ohio Scientific later married the drive to their Challenger III computer system, incorporating both the drive and the system into a 42-inch tall rack. Ohio Scientific was the first company to offer a microcomputer with hard drives.

Variants of the II and IIP with external 8-inch floppy disk drive units were introduced in April 1978. These systems were "unbundled"—lacking an external case and shipped without a power supply. Ohio Systems issued an external dual 5.25-inch floppy drive unit for the Challenger II by 1979. Starting in September 1977, Ohio Scientific shipped all Challenger systems ordered with floppy disk drives with OS-65D, the company's own disk operating system which included the filesystem, BASIC, an assembler, a disassembler, a line editor, and an extended debugger. Through the use of overlays, OS-65D never occupies more than 12 kB of RAM. It supports dual drive configurations and sequential and random file access, while its BASIC implementation allows linked code.

=== Challenger III (1977) ===
The Challenger III was released alongside the Challenger II in 1977. It was a desktop computer featuring three microprocessors—a MOS 6502A, a Zilog Z80, and a Motorola 6800—on one board. This combination of processors allowed the computer to run virtually all software for microcomputers on the market at the time of its release. Only one processor can be active at a time, preventing it from computing in parallel, but software interrupts allow programs to switch from processor to processor on the fly.

Ohio Scientific oriented the Challenger III as a development kit for students of computer science wanting to learn how to program for all three processor; as a small business or industrial machine, for organizations wanting to consolidate mission-critical applications for multiple platforms onto one unit; and for the extreme hobbyist. An external, single-sided (later double-sided), dual 8-inch floppy drive unit was available for the Challenger III, as was the C-D74 hard drive unit. Ohio Scientific was keen to match the Challenger III with the C-D74, offering both in a 74-inch tall rack-mount case as a complete system christened the C3-B—the first microcomputer system to include a hard drive. A variant of the C3-B with a cheaper, lower-capacity 24 MB drive was released by 1979. The C3-B was particularly useful as a database manager serving multiple client terminals. To this end, Ohio Scientific provided a serial I/O board called the CA-10, allowing up to sixteen terminals to connect to the Challenger III. A version of the Challenger III with integrated CA-10 and dual 8-inch floppy drives (but without the integral keyboard) was introduced as the C3-OEM in late 1978.

=== Superboard II, Challenger 1P (1978) ===
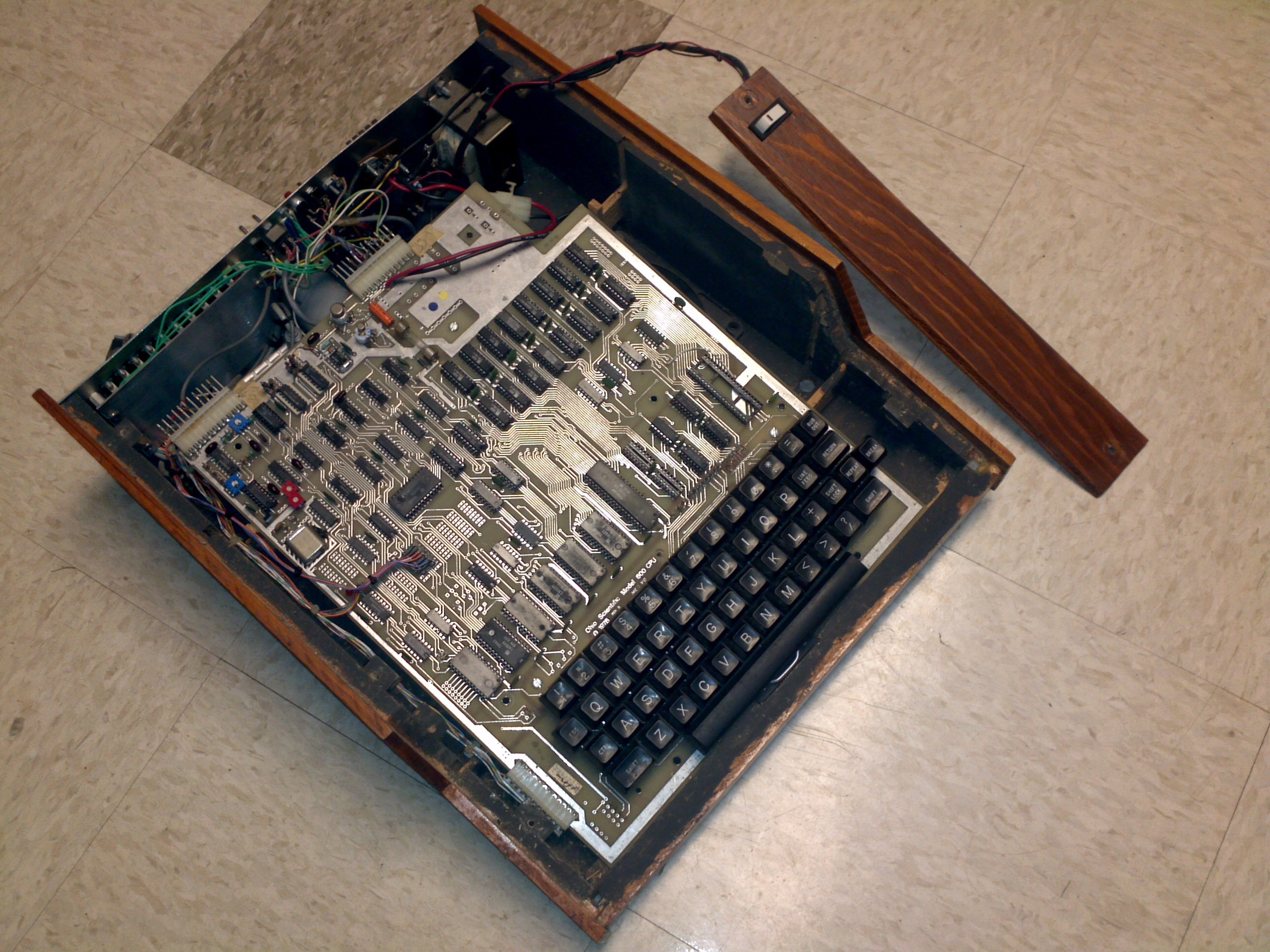
Superboard II residing inside a homemade wooden case

Released in fall 1978, the Superboard II featured a MOS 6502, 8 KB BASIC in ROM, a BIOS and machine code monitor in separate ROM, Microsoft Basic in ROM, 8 KB of static RAM, a cassette interface, and, most notably, a built-in keyboard soldered to the board. Ohio Scientific billed it as the first microcomputer integrated onto one single circuit board, owing to the soldered-on keyboard. The company introduced it alongside the Challenger 1P, essentially the same as the Superboard II but enclosed in a case and including a power supply. Optional for each were an 24 KB expansion RAM and floppy disk drive interface board, for supporting an external dual 5.25-inch floppy drive as well as a printer or modem.

The entire Superboard II measures 12 by 14.5 inches (30 by 37 cm). Ohio Scientific were able to reduce the chip count by using cutting-edge LSI chips, which combined many support chips onto one integrated circuit. All components on the board—57 ICs, several passives, the keyboard components, and a fuse—were soldered by hand; the board is free of solder mask and board legends. A clone of the Superboard II was sold in the United Kingdom as the Compukit UK101.

Bruce S. Chamberlain, writing in Kilobyte Microcomputing, praised the Superboard II's BASIC interpreter for its speed and called the system overall "less expensive than comparable systems" and "the best buy available for both beginner and expert. ... It is also easier and less expensive to expand than other computer systems". Byte's Christopher Morgan similarly called it "an excellent choice for the personal computer enthusiast on a budget".

=== Challenger 4P (1979) ===
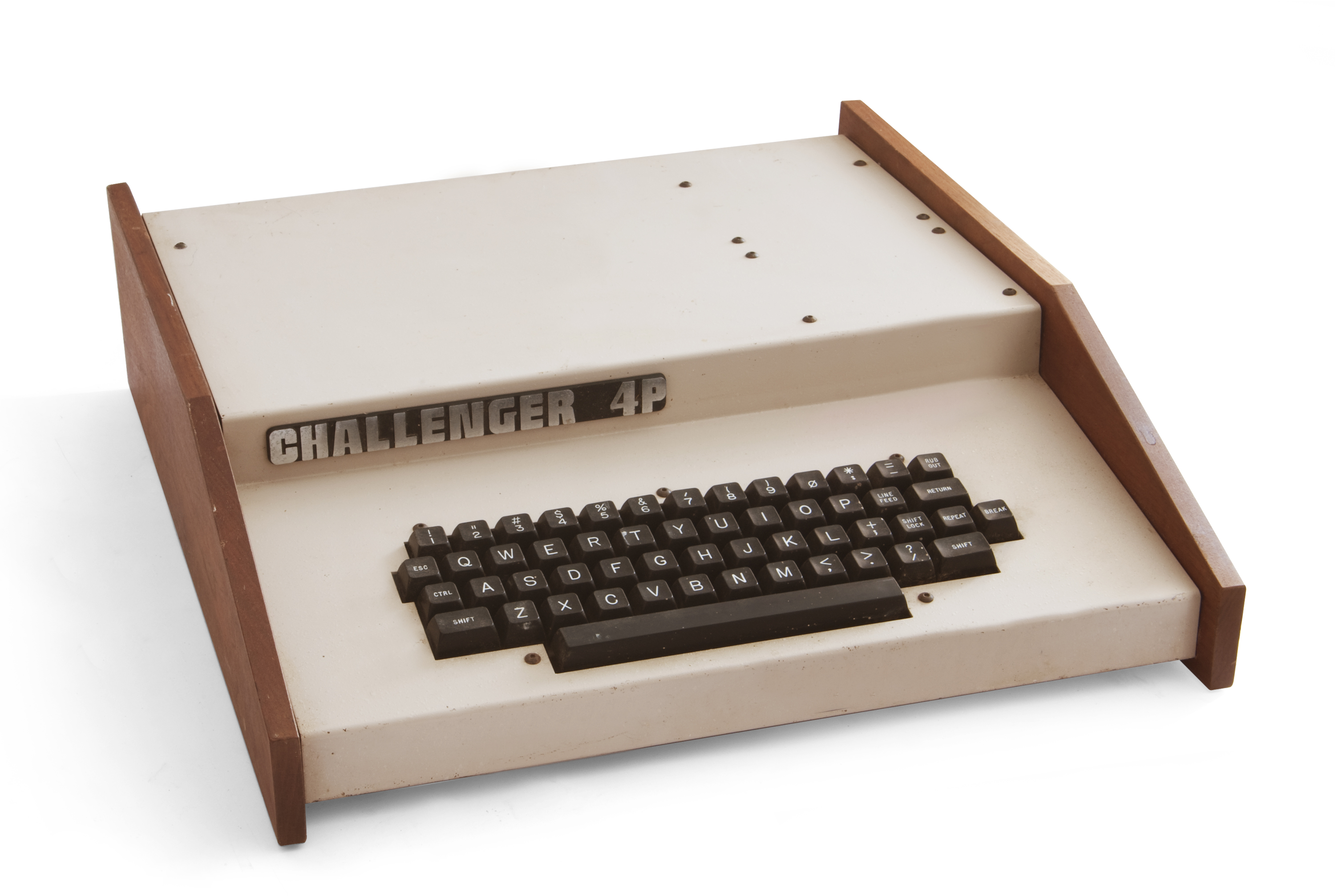
Challenger 4P

The Challenger 4P (4P MF), released in late 1979, was a keyboard computer like the Challenger IIP. Like all Challengers before it, the 4P ran off a 6502 microprocessor. It was the first in the line to feature native color graphics, displaying 16 color simultaneously in bitmap graphics mode. In text mode, it displays 64 columns by 32 rows. As with the Challenger II, characters in the code page are redesignable, allowing for complex shapes to be drawn even in text mode. The computer came with 24 KB of RAM stock, expandable to 48 KB. A DAC interface allows the generation of sound, voice output, analog joystick interfaces, and, unusually, a home automation interface. The Challenger 4P was very adept at this latter task, implementing the X10 industry standard protocol for home automation. Through special software, the computer can control up to 16 lights and appliances in the house. A "background mode" allows the user to run other applications in the foreground, while a timer resident in memory keeps track of X10 schedule and shuts appliances on and off accordingly.

=== C1P (MF) Series II (1980) ===
The C1P Series II was a redesign of Ohio Scientific's Challenger 1P with a vastly different case design made with a plastic shell, over top of the standard metal case. The 1P incorporates the DAC of the Challenger 4P to allow the computer to generate sound and music. The computer came stock with Microsoft 8K BASIC IN ROM, and 8KB of Static RAM, and it could have been expanded to have the home automation features of the 4P with the purchase of 630/10 expansion card. The C1P MF was a variant of the computer that came packaged with a dual 5.25-inch floppy drive unit and OS-MDMS, a small database management system.

== See also ==
- List of early microcomputers
