= History of personal computers =

The history of personal computers as mass-market consumer electronic devices began with the microcomputer revolution of the 1970s. A personal computer is one intended for interactive individual use, as opposed to a mainframe computer where the end user's requests are filtered through operating staff, or a time-sharing system in which one large processor is shared by many individuals.

After the development of the microprocessor, individual personal computers were low enough in cost that they eventually became affordable consumer goods. Early personal computers – generally called microcomputers – were sold often in electronic kit form and in limited numbers, and were of interest mostly to hobbyists and technicians.

== Etymology ==
There are several competing claims as to the origins of the term "personal computer". Yale Law School librarian Fred Shapiro notes an early published use of the phrase in a 1968 Hewlett-Packard advertisement for a programmable calculator, which they called "The new Hewlett-Packard 9100A personal computer." Other claims include computer pioneer Alan Kay's purported use of the term in a 1972 paper, Whole Earth Catalog publisher Stewart Brand's usage in a 1974 book, MITS co-founder Ed Roberts' usage in 1975, and Byte magazine's May 1976 usage of "[in] the personal computing field" in its first edition. In 1975, Creative Computing defined the personal computer as a "non-(time)shared system containing sufficient processing power and storage capabilities to satisfy the needs of an individual user."

== Overview ==
The history of the personal computer as mass-market consumer electronic devices effectively began in 1972 with the introduction of microcomputers, although some mainframe and minicomputers had been applied as single-user systems much earlier. A personal computer is one intended for interactive individual use, as opposed to a mainframe computer where the end user's requests are filtered through operating staff, or a time sharing system in which one large processor is shared by many individuals. After the development of the microprocessor, individual personal computers were low enough in cost that they eventually became affordable consumer goods. Early personal computers – generally called microcomputers – were sold often in electronic kit form and in limited numbers, and were of interest mostly to hobbyists and technicians.

=== Mainframes, minicomputers, and microcomputers ===
Computer terminals were used for time sharing access to central computers. Before the introduction of the microprocessor in the early 1970s, computers were generally large, costly systems owned by large corporations, universities, government agencies, and similar-sized institutions. End users generally did not directly interact with the machine, but instead would prepare tasks for the computer on off-line equipment, such as card punches. A number of assignments for the computer would be gathered up and processed in batch mode. After the job had completed, users could collect the results. In some cases, it could take hours or days between submitting a job to the computing center and receiving the output.

A more interactive form of computer use developed commercially by the middle 1960s. In a time-sharing system, multiple computer terminals let many people share the use of one mainframe computer processor. This was common in business applications and in science and engineering.

A different model of computer use was foreshadowed by the way in which early, pre-commercial, experimental computers were used, where one user had exclusive use of a processor. In places such as Carnegie Mellon University and MIT, students with access to some of the first computers experimented with applications that would today be typical of a personal computer; for example, computer-aided design and drafting was foreshadowed by T-square, a program written in 1961, and an ancestor of today's computer games was found in Spacewar! in 1962.

Some of the first computers that might be called "personal" were early minicomputers such as the LINC and PDP-8, and later on VAX and larger minicomputers from Digital Equipment Corporation (DEC), Data General, Prime Computer, and others. By today's standards, they were very large (about the size of a refrigerator) and cost prohibitive (typically tens of thousands of US dollars). However, they were much smaller, less expensive, and generally simpler to operate than many of the mainframe computers of the time. Therefore, they were accessible for individual laboratories and research projects. Minicomputers largely freed these organizations from the batch processing and bureaucracy of a commercial or university computing center.

In 1945, Vannevar Bush published an essay called "As We May Think" in which he outlined a possible solution to the growing problem of information storage and retrieval. In 1968, SRI researcher Douglas Engelbart gave what was later called "The Mother of All Demos", in which he offered a preview of things that have become the staples of daily working life in the 21st century: e-mail, hypertext, word processing, video conferencing, and the mouse. The demo was the culmination of research in Engelbart's Augmentation Research Center laboratory, which concentrated on applying computer technology to facilitate creative human thought.

In addition, minicomputers were relatively interactive and soon had their own operating systems. The minicomputer Xerox Alto (1973) was a landmark step in the development of personal computers because of its graphical user interface, bit-mapped high resolution screen, large internal and external memory storage, mouse, and special software.

=== Microprocessor and cost reduction ===
The minicomputer ancestors of the modern personal computer used early integrated circuit (microchip) technology, which reduced size and cost, but they contained no microprocessor. This meant that they were still large and difficult to manufacture just like their mainframe predecessors. After the "computer-on-a-chip" was commercialized, the cost to manufacture a computer system dropped dramatically. The arithmetic, logic, and control functions that previously occupied several costly circuit boards were now available in one integrated circuit, making it possible to produce them in high volume. Concurrently, advances in the development of solid-state memory eliminated the bulky, costly, and power-hungry magnetic-core memory used in prior generations of computers.

The single-chip microprocessor was made possible by an improvement in MOS technology: the silicon-gate MOS chip, developed in 1968 by Federico Faggin, who later used silicon-gate MOS technology to develop the first single-chip microprocessor, the Intel 4004, in 1971.

A few researchers at places such as SRI and Xerox PARC were working on computers that a single person could use and that could be connected by fast, versatile networks: not home computers, but personal ones. At RCA, Joseph Weisbecker designed and built a true home computer known as FRED, but this saw mixed interest from management. The CPU design was released as the COSMAC in 1974 and several experimental machines using it were built in 1975, but RCA declined to market any of these until introducing the COSMAC Elf in 1976, in kit form. By this time a number of other machines had entered the market.

After the introduction of the Intel 4004 in 1972, microprocessor costs declined rapidly. In 1974 the American electronics magazine Radio-Electronics described the Mark-8 computer kit, based on the Intel 8008 processor. In January 1975, Popular Electronics magazine published an article describing a kit based on the Intel 8080, a somewhat more powerful and easier to use processor. The Altair 8800 sold remarkably well, even though initial memory size was limited to a few hundred bytes and there was no software available.

However, the Altair kit was much less costly than an Intel development system of the time and so was purchased by companies interested in developing microprocessor control for their own products. Expansion memory boards and peripherals were soon listed by the original manufacturer, and later by plug compatible manufacturers.

The very first Microsoft product was a 4 kilobyte paper tape BASIC interpreter, which allowed users to develop programs in a higher-level language. The alternative was to hand-assemble machine code that could be directly loaded into the microcomputer's memory using a front panel of toggle switches, push buttons and LED displays. While the hardware front panel emulated those used by early mainframe and minicomputers, after a very short time I/O through a terminal was the preferred human/machine interface, and front panels became extinct.

== The beginnings of the personal computer industry ==
The "brain" [computer] may one day come down to our level [of the common people] and help with our income-tax and book-keeping calculations. But this is speculation and there is no sign of it so far.

— British newspaper The Star in a June 1949 news article about the EDSAC computer, long before the era of the personal computers.

=== Simon ===
Simon was a small electro-mechanical computer project developed by Edmund Berkeley and presented in a thirteen-article series in Radio-Electronics magazine from October 1950. The Simon was in some sense a personal computer, although it was not of much practical use. The four-function ALU was only 2 bits wide, meaning it was not capable of operating on any number greater than 3. There were far more sophisticated and practical computers available at the time (such as EDSAC), and the kit was intended only as an educational machine for hobbyists to learn about the operation and design of a digital computer. The value in Simon was that the digital principles learnt could be scaled up to the task of building a larger and more useful machine.

=== LGP-30 ===
The LGP-30 was an off-the-shelf vacuum-tube computer manufactured by the Librascope company of Glendale, California. The LGP-30 was first manufactured in 1956, at a retail price of $47,000. The LGP-30 was commonly referred to as a desk computer, as it was the size of a desk. It weighed about 800 pounds (360 kg). It was a binary, 31-bit word computer with a 4096-word drum memory. Standard inputs were the Flexowriter keyboard and paper tape. The standard output was the Flexowriter typewriter. Up to 493 units were produced.

=== IBM 610 ===
The IBM 610 was a vacuum-tube computer designed by John Lentz at the Watson Lab of Columbia University. It was announced by IBM as the 610 Auto-Point in 1957. The machine consisted of a large cabinet but could fit in a conventional office and required no specialist arrangements for air conditioning or power. It was intended to be used by only one operator and was symbolically programmable using a keyboard. With a price tag of $55,000, only 180 units were produced and it was quickly displaced by the transistorized IBM 1620.

=== LINC ===
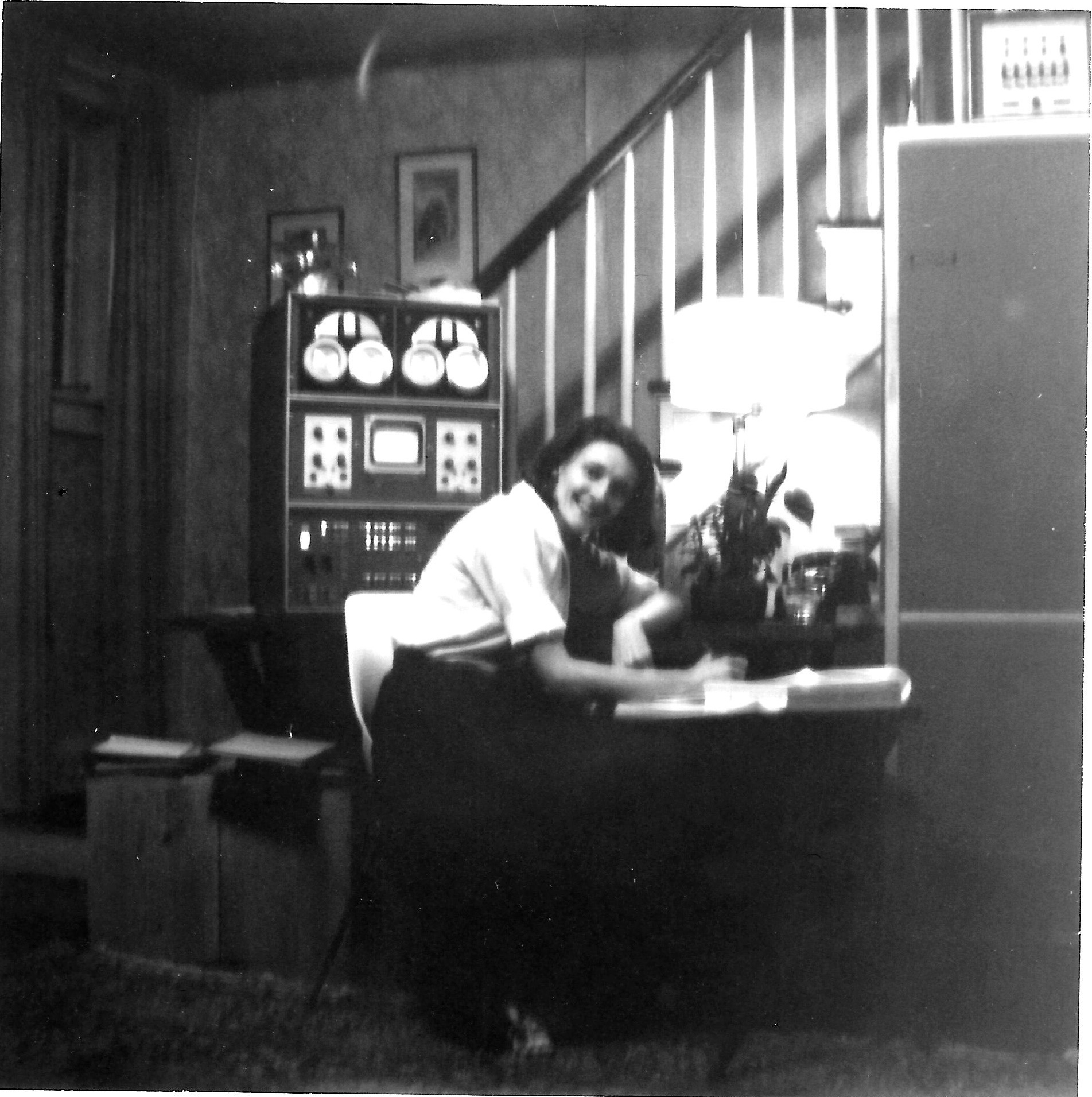
The LINC in use in a home

The LINC (Laboratory INstrument Computer) was an early minicomputer first produced in 1962 at MIT's Lincoln Laboratory. The machine was intended for use in biomedical research applications. The LINC consisted of a large unit that could fit on a desk with keyboard input and a monitor screen constructed from an oscilloscope, although it required a second chassis about the size of a wardrobe that contained the CPU and memory.

Despite its size, the LINC had the nascent characteristics of a personal computer, being one of the first machines specifically intended to serve a single user as opposed to being a shared resource. Machines of the day were most usually extremely large fixed installations. The LINC was just barely portable to another location by a single person. It was possible to disassemble and fit all of the apparatus into a car and assemble it in a reasonable time for use elsewhere without the support of a computer lab.

=== Olivetti Programma 101 ===
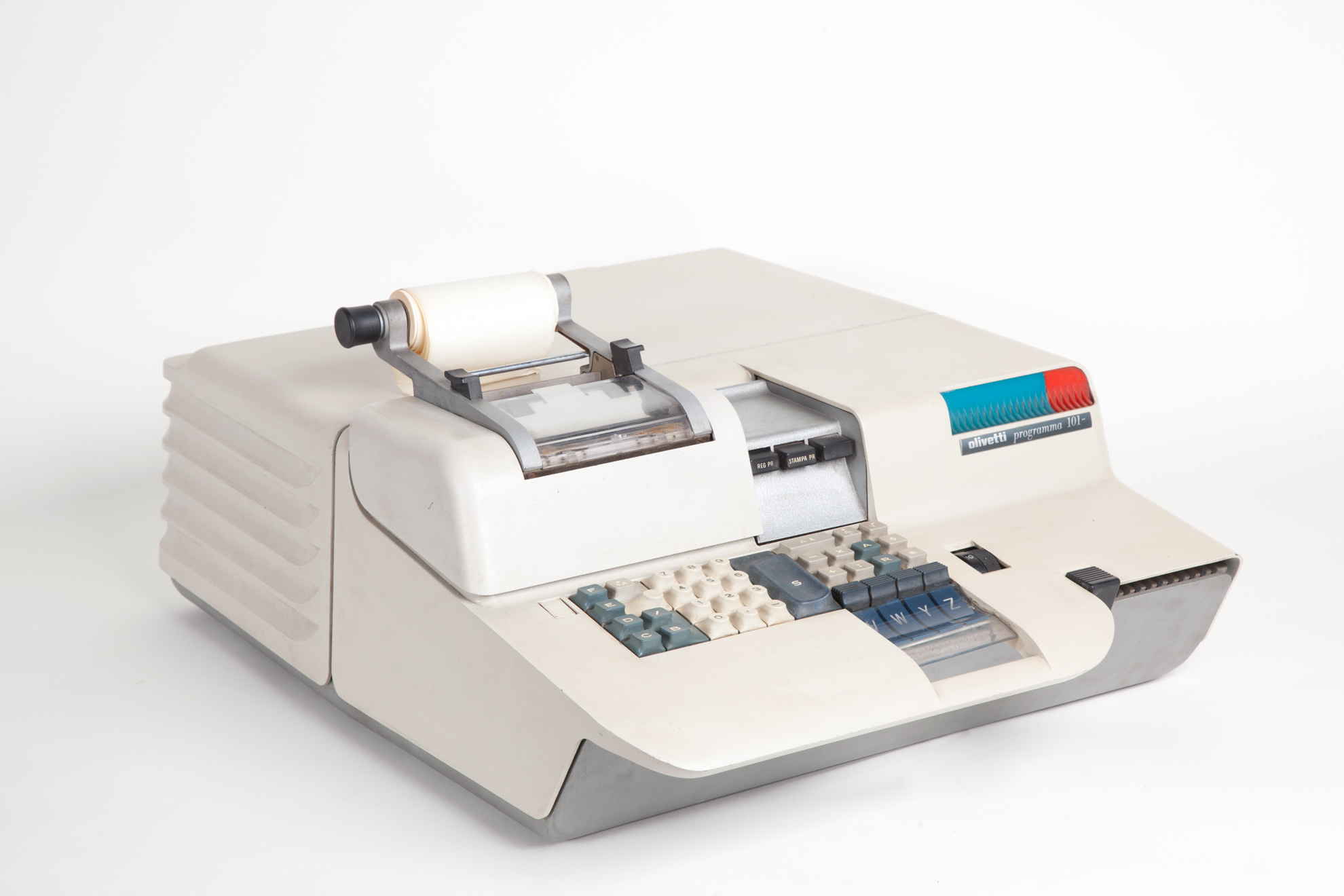
The Olivetti Programma 101

The Programma 101, released in 1965 by the Italian company Olivetti, was one of the first printing programmable calculators. The desktop sized device included the capability for conditional jumps with a 240 byte delay-line memory which enabled software to be written. Some of the design was based on a preceding experimental computer produced by a young Federico Faggin who would later design the first commercial microprocessor at Intel.

The Programma 101 was presented at the 1965 New York World's Fair after two years' work (1962–1964) and was a commercial success, with over 44,000 units sold worldwide; in the US its cost at launch was $3,200. It was targeted to offices and scientific entities for their daily work because of its capable computing in a small space with a relatively low cost; NASA was among its first owners. Built without integrated circuits or microprocessors, it used only transistors, resistors, and condensers for processing. The Programma 101 had features found in modern personal computers, such as memory, keyboard, printing unit, magnetic card reader/recorder, control and arithmetic unit. Hewlett-Packard was later ordered to pay Olivetti $900,000 for patent infringement of this design in its HP 9100 series.

=== Datapoint 2200 ===
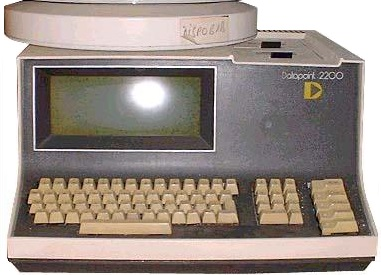
1970: Datapoint 2200

Released in June 1970, the programmable terminal called the Datapoint 2200 is among the earliest known devices that bears significant resemblance to the modern personal computer, with a CRT screen, keyboard, programmability, and program storage. It was made by CTC (later known as Datapoint after the success of this machine) and was a complete system in a case with the approximate footprint of an IBM Selectric typewriter.

The system's CPU was constructed from roughly a hundred (mostly) TTL logic components, which are groups of gates, latches, counters, etc. The company had commissioned Intel to develop a single-chip solution with similar functionality. In the end, the chip did not meet CTC's requirements and was not used. A deal was made that in return for not charging CTC for the development work, Intel could instead sell the processor as its own product (along with the supporting ICs it had developed). This became the Intel 8008.

Although the design of the Datapoint 2200's TTL based bit serial CPU and the Intel 8008 were technically very different, they were largely software-compatible. From a software perspective, the Datapoint 2200 therefore functioned as if it were using an 8008.

=== Kenbak-1 ===
The Kenbak-1, released in early 1971, is considered by the Computer History Museum to be the world's first personal computer. It was designed and invented by John Blankenbaker of Kenbak Corporation in 1970, and was first sold in early 1971. Unlike a modern personal computer, the Kenbak-1 was built of small-scale integrated circuits, and did not use a microprocessor. The system first sold for US$750. Only 44 machines were ever sold, though it's said 50 to 52 were built. In 1973, production of the Kenbak-1 stopped as Kenbak Corporation folded.

With a fixed 256 bytes of memory, input and output restricted to lights and switches (no ports or serial output), and no possible way to extend its capabilities, the Kenbak-1 was only really useful for educational use.

256 bytes of memory, 8 bit word size, and I/O limited to switches and lights on the front panel are also characteristics of the 1975 Altair 8800, whose fate was diametrically opposed to that of the Kenbak. However, there were three major differentiating factors between the Altair and the Kenbak which led to the later Altair 8800 selling over 25000 units and influencing many, while the Kenbak-1 only sold 44, and influenced mostly no one.

- The Kenbak-1, designed before the invention of the microprocessor, had a limited instruction set that was professionally considered "incompatible with microcomputer application goals", according to a citation pointing at the KENBAK-1 programming manual in the contemporary February 1974 issue of RCA Engineer Magazine.
- The Kenbak-1 had no ability for expansion. There were no expansion slots, and tragically, no serial port or any other way to get data out of the machine (other than the 8 lamps on the front). There was also no way to load data into the machine other than its physical switches. There was no ability to upgrade the capacity of the RAM, and even if there were, there would have been no way to simultaneously address more than 256 bytes of RAM due to limitations of the machine code language.
- The Kenbak-1 was not advertised outside of the educational market. It was advertised in Science magazine and in-person at a local teacher's convention. There was no attempt to market the machine at the hobbyist market as later successful computers did. John Blankenbaker would later cite this as the reason that his machine failed, as the educational market was "too slow" to adopt his machine while it could have been relevant. However, it is also worth noting that in the educational market, the Kenbak-1 was competing against timeshares of more capable and established computers such as the PDP-8.

If the Kenbak-1 were advertised better, and the machine had at least one serial port to make it more useful, it may have done very well at its price-point of $750 in 1971, which no other Turing-complete computer on the market came close to. However, it would not be very long before personal computers based on the much more capable Intel 8008 would come to market, followed shortly after once again by the ten-times-as-fast Intel 8080, in the highly-expandable Altair 8800.

=== The single-chip CPU ===
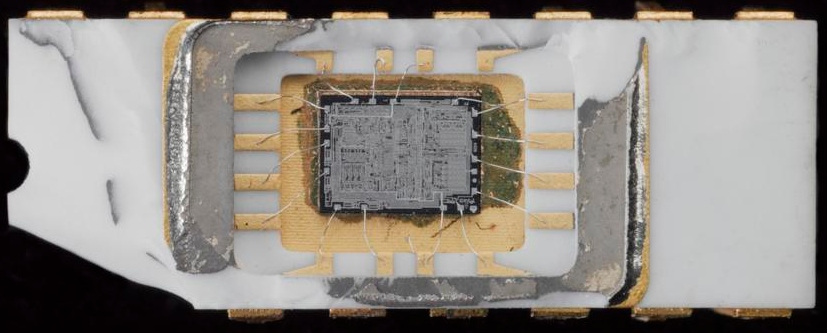
An Intel 4004 with the chip exposed

In 1967, Italian engineer Federico Faggin joined SGS-Fairchild of Italy where he worked on Metal Oxide Semiconductor (MOS) integrated circuits which had higher switching speeds and lower power consumption than alternatives. He was later sent to a California division. There he developed self-aligned silicon gate technology (from an original idea by Bell labs) which improved the reliability of MOS transistors and assisted with the commercial viability of the process. He also developed important technologies that improved circuit density of chips such as the "buried contact" technique.

Fairchild were not using Faggin's work and in 1970 he moved to the recently founded Intel. There he joined a team developing the first commercially available microprocessor, the 4-bit Intel 4004. Japanese electronics company Busicom had approached Intel in 1969 for a set of several separate chips to implement a CPU for their calculator products. They had the idea of building the calculator from a standardised general purpose computer that they could re-program to implement different models for use in different markets.

Intel employee, Marcian Hoff, realised the design would be too expensive. He suggested combining the multiple CPU chips requested by Busicom into a single chip (a technique which generally reduces product cost because there are fixed costs associated with producing each individual device) and also reducing the complexity. This design was later improved by Stanley Mazor. Faggin brought the silicon design expertise to the team and using his latest techniques that improved device density, managed to squeeze it all into a single chip.

Busicom was in financial trouble and Intel arranged a deal that enabled them to sell the CPU as a product in exchange for lowering costs to Busicom. In 1971, this was marketed as the Intel 4004 and was the first commercial single chip microprocessor. Coincidentally, Computer Terminal Corporation (CTC) had approached Intel also in 1969 with a request to reduce the chip count in one of their Datapoint terminal range, resulting in a similar single-chip CPU design.

CTC ultimately declined the device, leaving Intel with the intellectual property. This resulted in the Intel 8008, released in 1972, that would eventually become the foundation of Intel's personal computer CPU range. It was followed by the Intel 8080 in 1974, the Intel 8086 in 1978 and the cost-reduced 8088 in 1979, used in the original IBM PC.

The single-chip CPU went on to significantly reduce the costs (and size) of computers and place the devices within the purchasing power of individuals. In only a few years, a number of other manufacturers were producing competing single-chip CPUs including the Motorola 6800 (1974), the Fairchild F8 (1974), the MOS Technology 6502 (1975) and the National Semiconductor SC/MP (1976). Federico Faggin would go on to co-found Zilog which would produce the Z80 in 1976. Some of these CPUs would be widely used in early personal computers and other applications.

=== Q1 ===
On December 11, 1972, Q1 Corporation sold the first Q1 microcomputer, based on the Intel 8008 microprocessor. The first generation 8008-based Q1 and Q1/c had a QWERTY keyboard, one-line 80-character display, built-in printer, and capability to interface with an under-desk floppy drive. (From this point on, the names "Q1" and "Q1/Lite" seem to be used interchangeably on the computer's enclosure and in its marketing.)

The second generation 1974 Q1/Lite ran on an Intel 8080, integrated two floppy drives into the computer's enclosure, and included an updated multi-line flat-panel plasma display. Around this time, a Q1 MicroLite was also introduced, incorporating the Lite's plasma display and printer but only one of its two floppy drives into an identical case.

There also seems to have been a Q1 model with an enclosure, printer, and display identical to that of the second-generation Lite/MicroLite, but lacking both floppy drives; and yet another, with a slightly modified case, which lacked both the integrated printer and floppy drives entirely. (The former of these two was incorrectly labeled as a first-generation 1972 Q1 when a unit of this model was found in early 2024.)

The third generation Q1/Lite system removed the integrated printer and floppy drives, kept the plasma display, and introduced a Zilog Z80 CPU and 16 KB of memory. At some point, a Q1 "Basic Office Machine" was also introduced, bearing resemblance to the third-generation Q1/Lite, but re-integrating a printer.

Several Q1s were ordered for use in various NASA bases in 1979.

=== Micral N ===
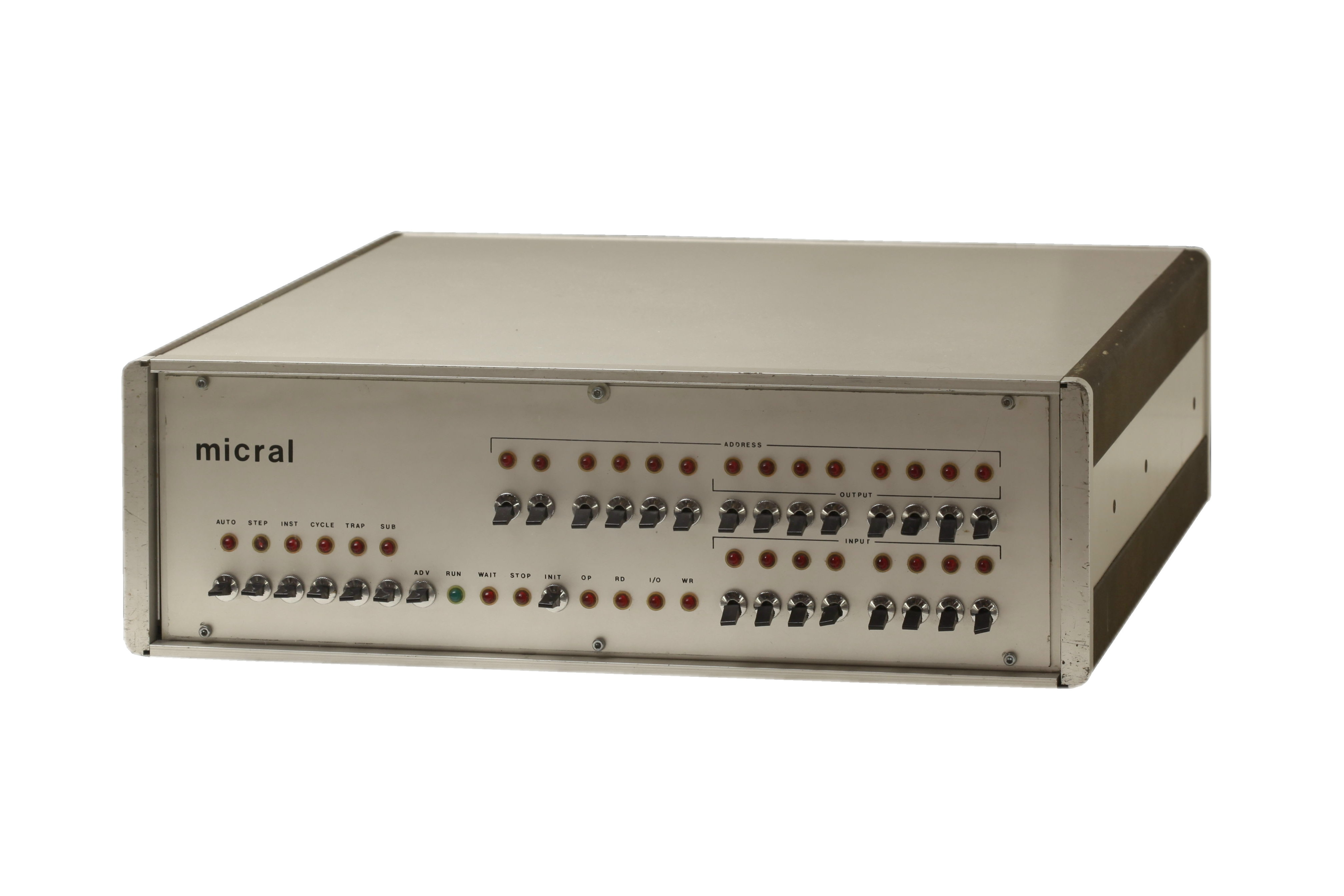
The Micral N

The French company R2E was formed by two former engineers of the Intertechnique company to sell their microcomputer designs based around the Intel 8008, beginning with the Micral N in 1973. The system was originally developed for the Institut national de la recherche agronomique to automate crop hygrometric measurements. The Micral N is credited as being the first commercially available microcomputer to feature a single chip CPU. It was possible to use the Micral as a personal computer but most were sold for use as controllers in automation applications.

The Micral N ran at 500 kHz, included 16 KB of memory and sold for 8500 Francs. A bus, called Pluribus, was introduced that allowed connection of up to 14 boards. Boards for digital I/O, analog I/O, memory, floppy disk were available from R2E. The Micral operating system was initially called Sysmic, and was later renamed Prologue.

R2E was absorbed by Groupe Bull in 1978. Although Groupe Bull continued the production of Micral computers, it was not interested in the personal computer market, and Micral computers were mostly confined to highway toll gates (where they remained in service until 1992) and similar niche markets.

=== Intel Intellec ===
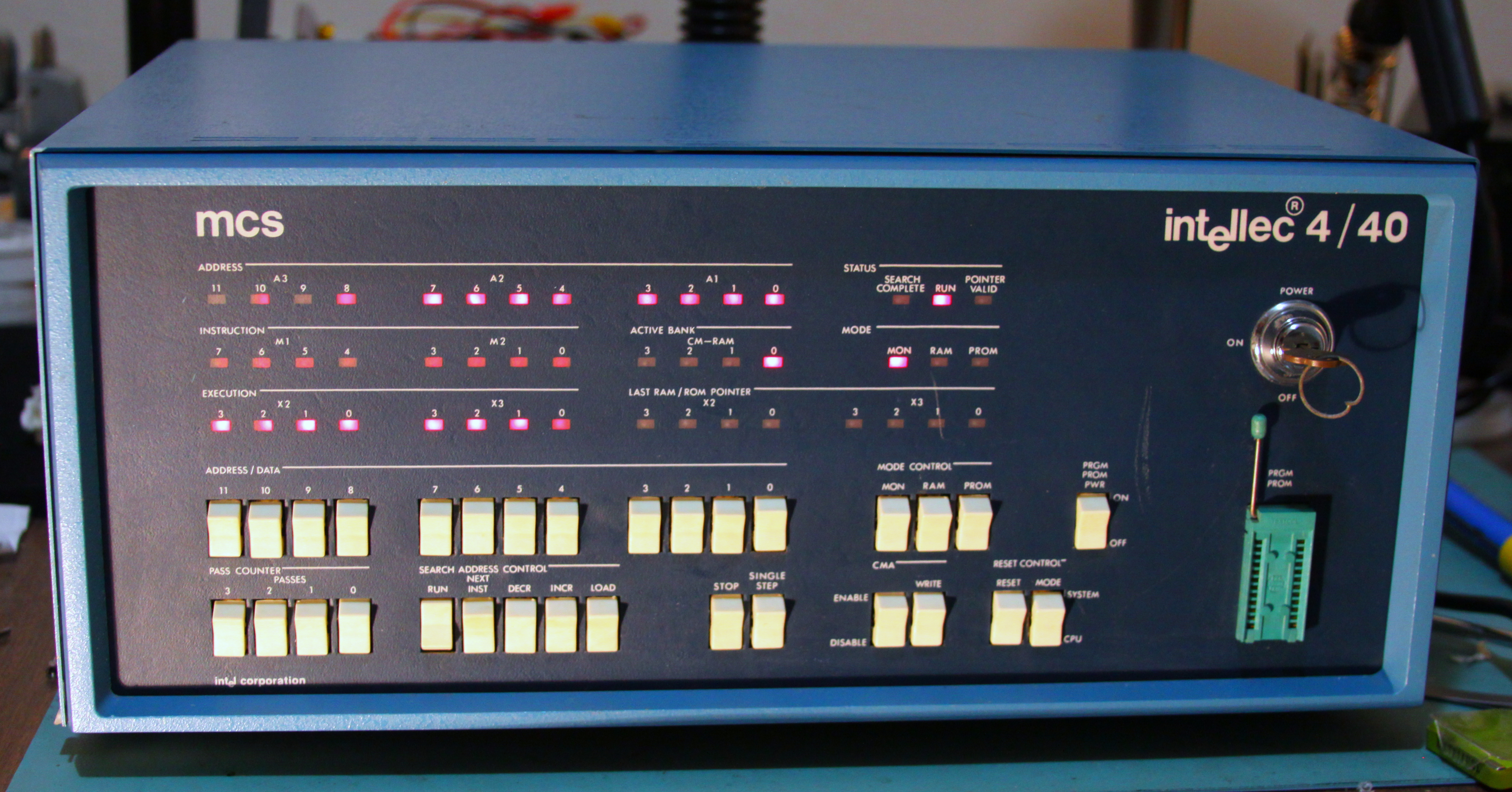
Intel Intellec 4 Mod 40

The Intellec was a microcomputer released by Intel in 1973 intended as a platform to support software development for their newly released series of microprocessors from the 4004 to the 8080. The machines were not openly marketed to the public and were aimed mainly at developers. The Intellec featured a ZIF socket on the front panel for programming EPROM chips. The intent was the EPROM chips would be used in embedded devices. The Intellec bore a resemblance to the Altair 8800 which would be released about two years later. While it could be used as a general purpose microcomputer, this was not Intel's intent.

=== The Front Panel ===
A front panel, consisting of LEDs and toggle switches, was a distinctive feature of many 1970s personal computers that is not usually seen on modern machines. The panel could be used to enter programs into the machine, but the process is particularly laborious. A memory address can be set on the toggle switches in binary, then this is followed by the data to be stored at that memory location, also set in binary via the switches. The rows of LEDs can be used to display the contents of a specific memory address.

In some respects the front panel was simply a continuation of a common feature supplied on minicomputers of the time, but it did have some practical uses. Keyboards, displays and terminals were very expensive peripherals and the front panel represented a cheap way to interact with the computer that could be supplied with the machine as standard. A hobbyist could then immediately make some use of their new purchase out of the box.

The front panel was often used for bootstrapping. When initially switched on, a computer needs to understand how to read its initial program (such as an operating system) from disk. The earliest machines did not contain the relevant software to do this and the machine would do nothing at all when initially powered on. A simple program informing the machine how to read a larger program from attached storage could be entered on the front panel.

=== Xerox Alto and Star ===
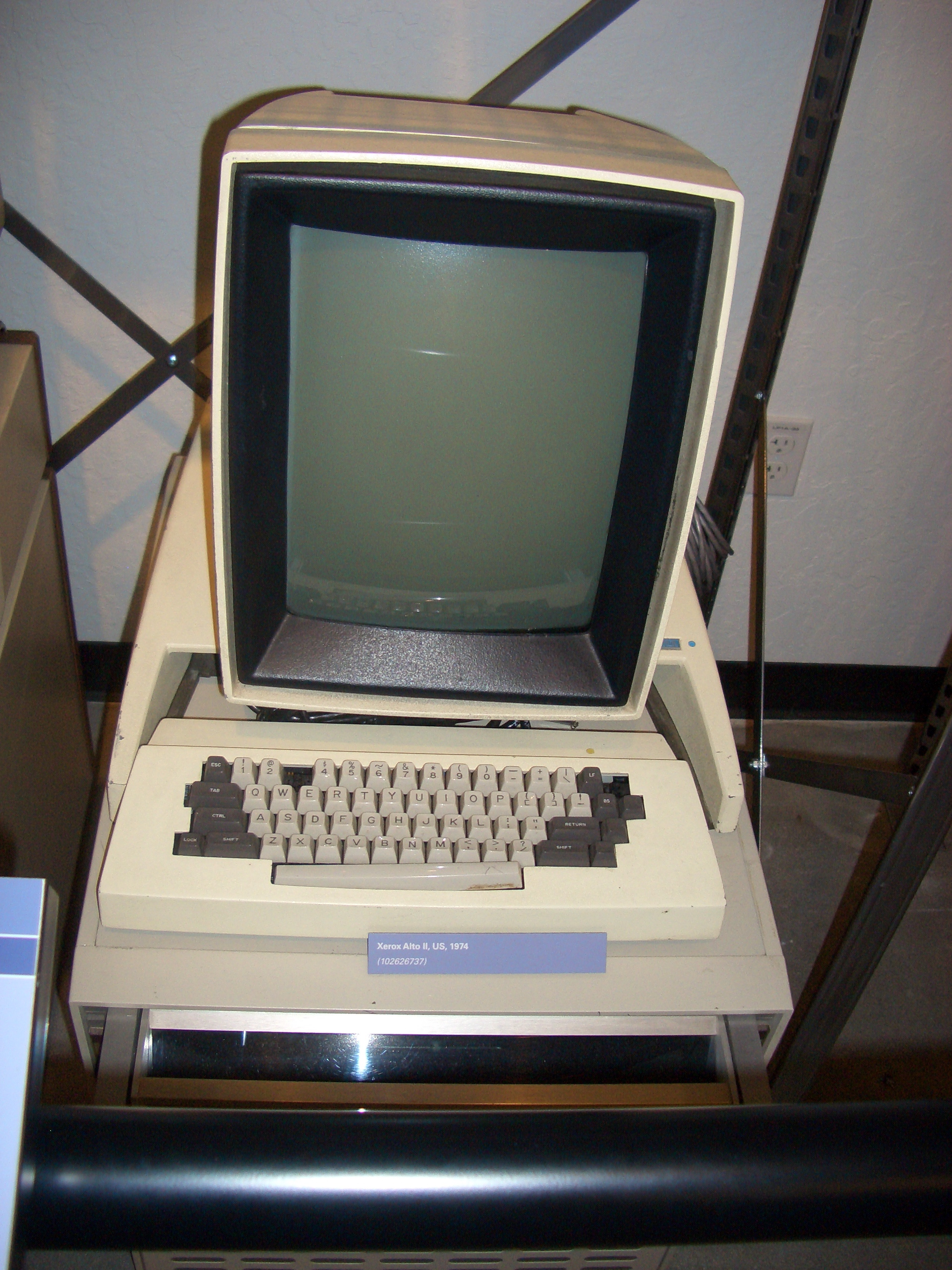
The 1973 Xerox Alto

The Xerox Alto, developed at Xerox PARC in 1973, was the first computer to use a mouse, the desktop metaphor, and a graphical user interface (GUI), concepts first introduced by Douglas Engelbart while at International. It was the first example of what would today be recognized as a complete personal computer. The first machines were introduced on 1 March 1973.

In 1981, Xerox Corporation introduced the Xerox Star workstation, officially known as the "8010 Star Information System". Drawing upon its predecessor, the Xerox Alto, it was the first commercial system to incorporate various technologies that today have become commonplace in personal computers, including a bit-mapped display, a window-based graphical user interface, icons, folders, mouse, Ethernet networking, file servers, print servers and e-mail.

While its use was limited to the engineers at Xerox PARC, the Alto had features years ahead of its time. Both the Xerox Alto and the Xerox Star would inspire the Apple Lisa and the Apple Macintosh.

=== IBM SCAMP ===
In 1972–1973, a team led by Dr. Paul Friedl at the IBM Los Gatos Scientific Center developed a portable computer prototype called SCAMP (Special Computer APL Machine Portable) based on the IBM PALM processor with a Philips compact cassette drive, small CRT and full function keyboard. SCAMP emulated an IBM 1130 minicomputer in order to run APL\1130. In 1973 APL was generally available only on mainframe computers, and most desktop sized microcomputers such as the Wang 2200 or HP 9800 offered only BASIC. Because it was the first to emulate APL\1130 performance on a portable, single-user computer, PC Magazine in 1983 designated SCAMP a "revolutionary concept" and "the world's first personal computer". The prototype is in the Smithsonian Institution.

=== CP/M ===
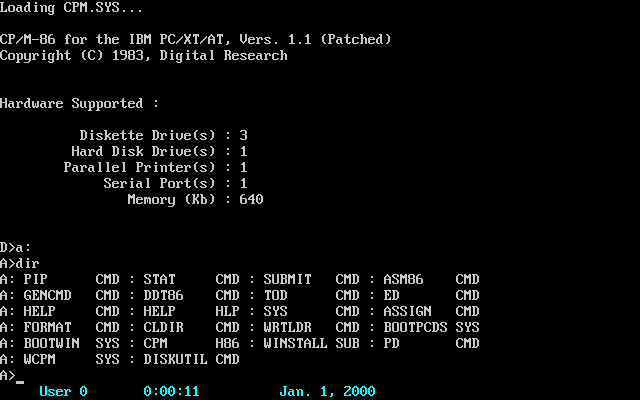
A screenshot of CP/M-86

Into the late 1970s, an operating system (O/S) was an optional extra for personal computers. It was common to run software directly on the machine with no O/S loaded at all. An application would load from disk or tape and then when a different application was required, the machine would be reset and a different disk inserted. Particularly, games software would operate in this way to reclaim the memory that the O/S used.

Disk drives were relatively complicated to control and it was helpful for cross-compatibility between business software for files to always be written in the same way by each piece of software. The user would also need a suite of tools to copy, rename and move files between disks. A large number of entirely different personal computers would emerge with incompatible hardware and it was helpful to have a unified platform where software could be written once and would run across all of them. As the cost of memory fell, demand would increase to have more than one program loaded simultaneously. An operating system would help solve these problems.

Operating systems were common on mainframes and minicomputers but in the nascent personal computer space, little was available other than a monitor. While this term now most commonly refers to display hardware, it referred at the time to a small program specific to each computer that was capable of starting other software, some debugging, and maybe saving memory contents at specified locations to a storage device. Gary Kildall developed CP/M in 1974 as an O/S for the Intel Intellec and established his company, Digital Research, in the same year. CP/M originally stood for "Control Program/Monitor" but later became "Control Program for Microcomputers". It was first licensed to a small manufacturer called Gnat Computers in 1977. By that year the number of computer vendors was increasing and demand for a standardised operating system grew. CP/M 2.0 was developed in 1978. By 1981, over 250,000 copies had been sold and the O/S had a large library of compatible software written for it.

=== IBM 5100 ===
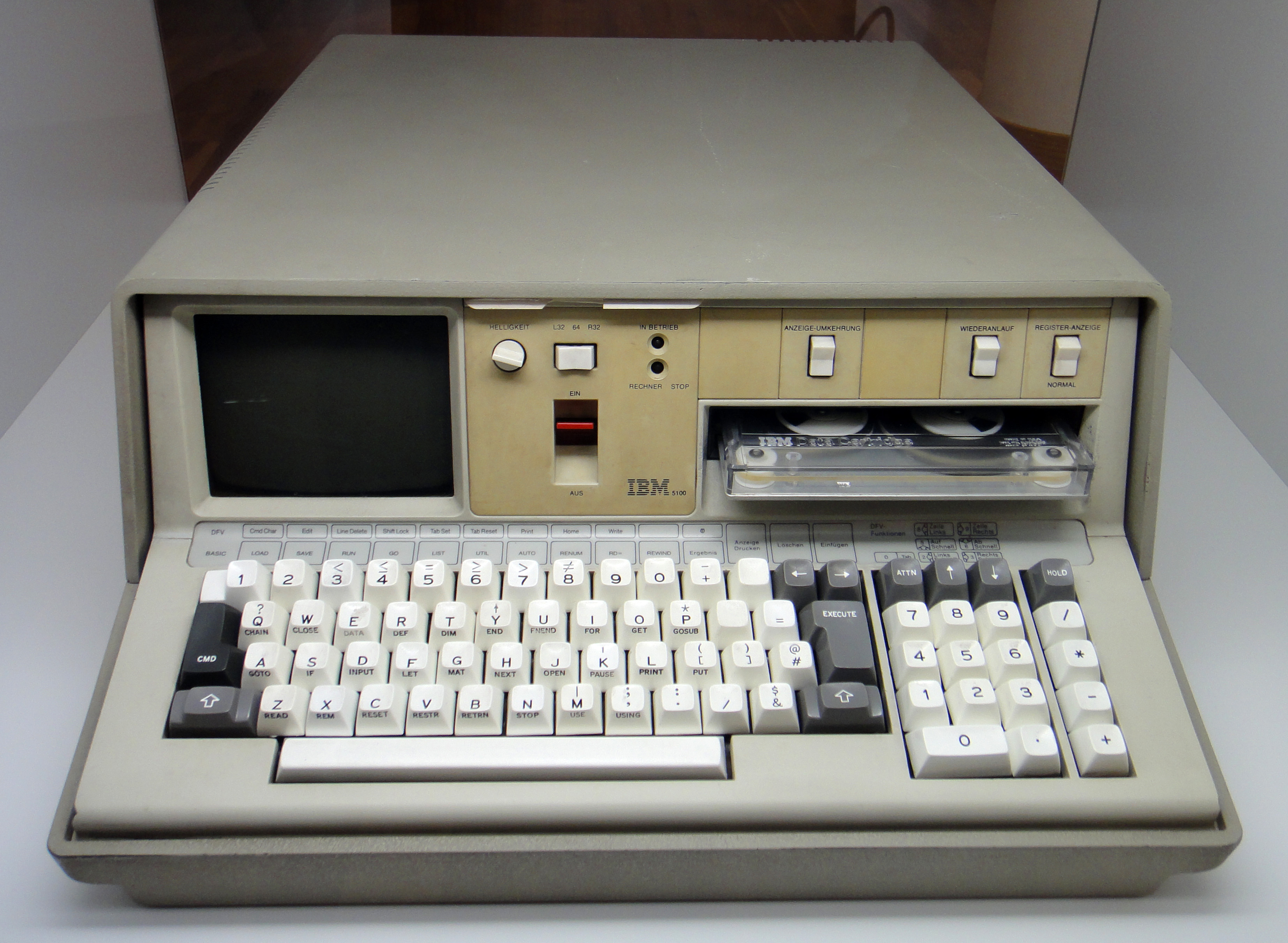
A 1975 IBM 5100

IBM 5100 was a desktop computer introduced in September 1975, six years before the IBM PC. It was the evolution of SCAMP (Special Computer APL Machine Portable) that IBM demonstrated in 1973. In January 1978 IBM announced the IBM 5110, its larger cousin. The 5100 was withdrawn in March 1982.

When the PC was introduced in 1981, it was originally designated as the IBM 5150, putting it in the "5100" series, though its architecture wasn't directly descended from the IBM 5100.

=== Kit Computers ===
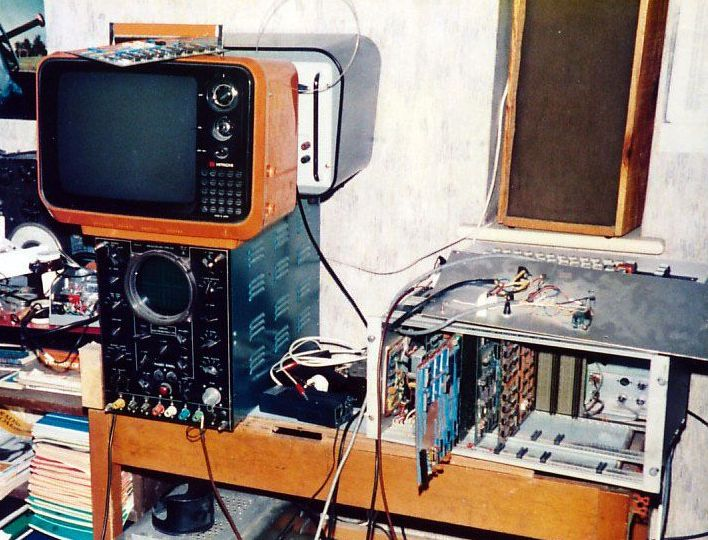
A hobbyist produced Newbear 77-68 kit computer (right) shown next to an oscilloscope (left) used in construction, with a domestic television on top used as a computer display. A keyboard is just visible on top of the machine.

Development of the single-chip microprocessor was the gateway to the popularization of cheap, easy to use, and truly personal computers. In the mid to late 1970s, interest was gaining momentum amongst hobbyists around the idea that it was now becoming economically feasible for an individual to own a personal computer. To serve this demand a number of publications and organisations began producing computer designs that hobbyists could construct.

The designs were sometimes available assembled but were less commonly finished products and ranged from purely circuit diagrams supplied on paper, through to provision of a PCB with or without a selection of parts, to partially completed boards with some components soldered. Through kits, personal computers were now in theory easily available to the general public but in practice some considerable expertise was required to construct and use these products, which restricted uptake to only the enthusiast market.

Assembling a kit computer necessitated soldering skills, the ability to identify electronic components, access to test equipment and fault finding knowledge. The kit format though enabled small organisations with no manufacturing facility or experience to release a machine with little capital required and low commercial risk.

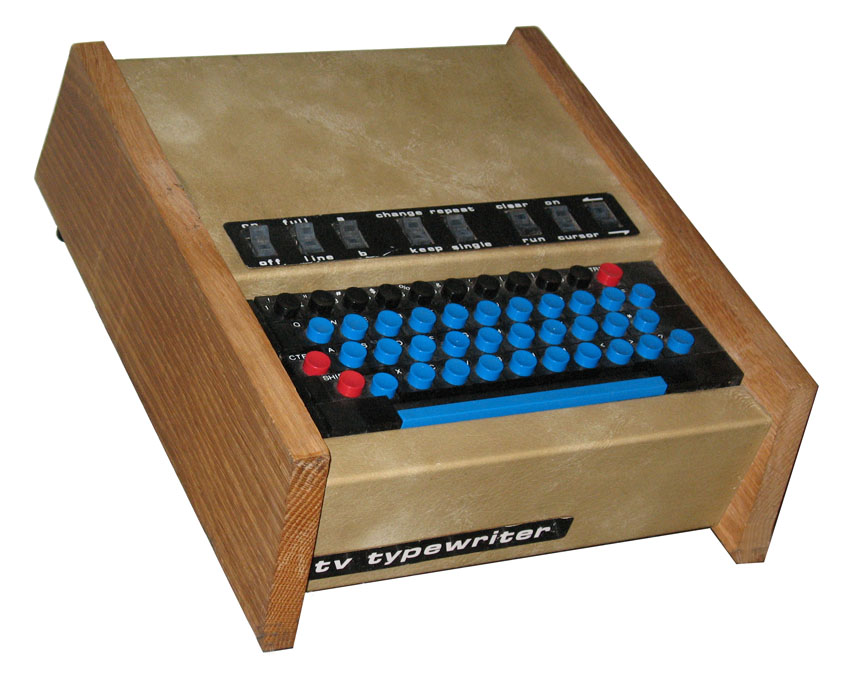
The original prototype of the 1973 TV Typewriter

A precursor to the kit computer appeared in the form of the TV Typewriter, which was published in Radio-Electronics magazine in 1973. The device was not a computer but demonstrated how many techniques that would shortly become standard features of personal computers could be implemented at an affordable price. The device showed how characters could be typed on a keyboard, rendered on a domestic television set and edited interactively. Expensive commercial terminals could do this but the TV Typewriter held the promise of considerably lower cost and was an instant hit with electronics enthusiasts. Several thousand copies of the plans were sold.

A further evolution of kit computers was in the form of educational machines such as the MOS KIM-1 released in 1976 and later rebranded as a Commodore product. These were not kits intended to be general purpose personal computers but instead would demonstrate the basics of computer programming and hardware to enthusiasts, hobbyists and commercial users. Educational kits would include only limited or no features at all for connection of peripherals but instead might include LED displays and calculator style keyboards for interaction with the machine. Kits then moved on to more capable designs.

Dozens of kit computer designs were produced, including the Mark-8 (1974) published in Radio-Electronics magazine, the Altair 8800 (1975), the SWTPC 6800 (1975), the COSMAC Elf (1976) in Popular Electronics magazine, the Newbear 77-68 (1977) and the Transam Triton (1978) from Electronics Today International magazine. The first product of Apple, the Apple I (1976), was partially a kit computer, requiring some additional components to be supplied, although the main board was available assembled.

By the end of the 1970s more machines were becoming available as finished products. The Sinclair ZX80 (1980) was available in both formats as either an assembled product or as an electronics kit at a lower price. By the early 1980s many choices of professionally manufactured personal computer were available at affordable prices and kit machines largely disappeared.

=== Altair 8800 ===
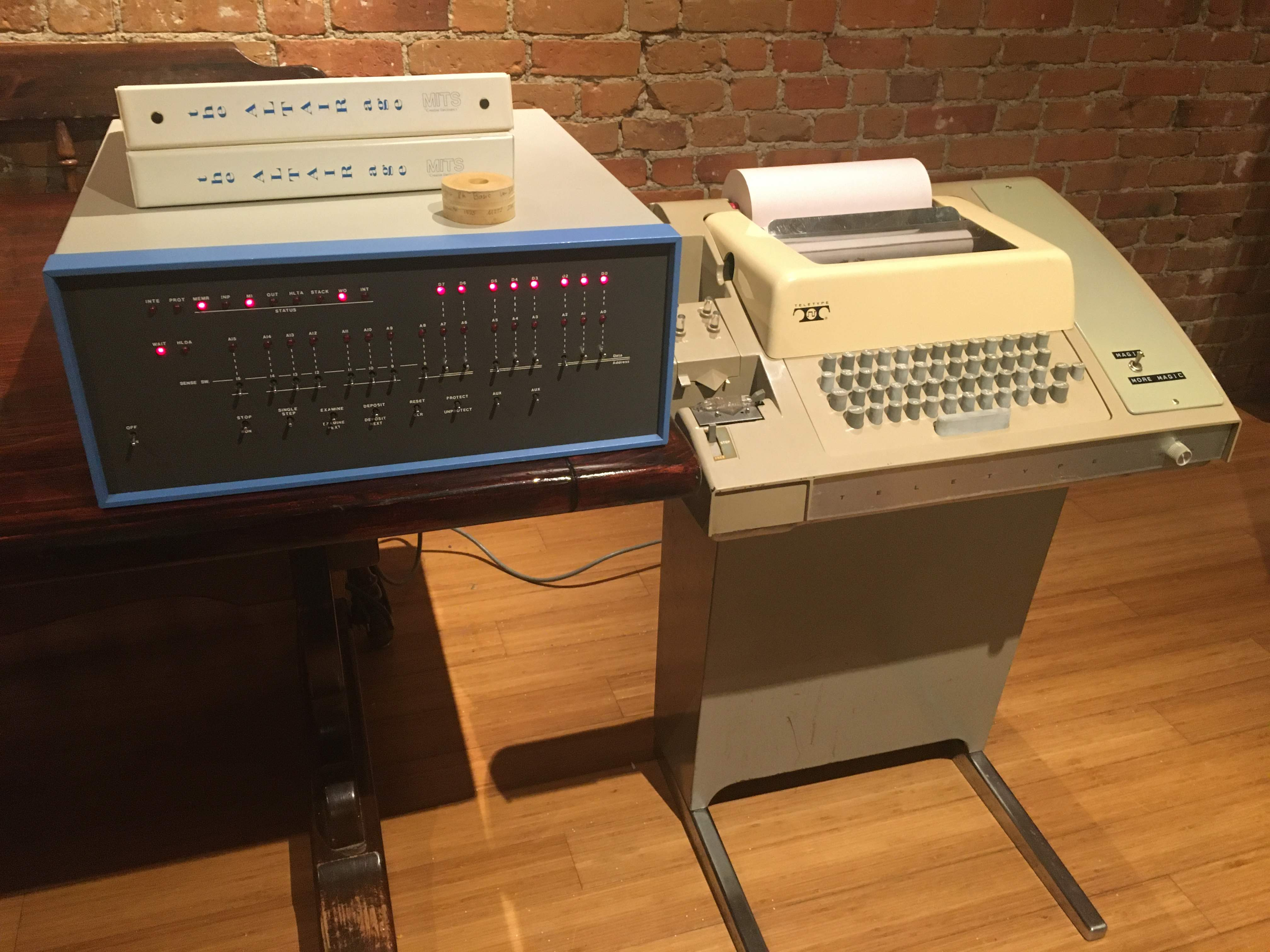
A MITS Altair 8800 (left) with an ASR 33 teletype (right)

It was only a matter of time before one personal computer design was able to hit a sweet spot in terms of pricing and performance, and that machine is generally considered to be the Altair 8800, from MITS, a small company that produced electronics kits for hobbyists.

The Altair 8800 was introduced in a Popular Electronics magazine article in the January 1975 issue (published in late 1974). In keeping with MITS' earlier projects, the Altair was sold in kit form, although a relatively complex one consisting of four circuit boards and many parts. Priced at only $400, the Altair tapped into pent-up demand and surprised its creators when it generated thousands of orders in the first month. Unable to keep up with demand, MITS sold the design after about 10,000 kits had shipped.

The introduction of the Altair spawned an entire industry based on the basic layout and internal design. New companies like Cromemco started up to supply add-on kits. Soon after, a number of complete "clone" designs, typified by the IMSAI 8080, appeared on the market. This led to a wide variety of systems based on the S-100 bus introduced with the Altair, machines of generally improved performance, quality and ease-of-use.

The Altair was relatively difficult to use. No peripherals were supplied with the machine. It did not include a keyboard or display or even any circuitry that might control such devices. One possible mode of operation was via a teletype terminal with the addition of a serial interface card. The Teletype Corporation model ASR 33 was a popular choice, being commonly used with minicomputers of the era, but was both expensive and difficult for an individual to obtain. The teletype cost several times the price of the Altair and the manufacturer was not used to retail sales. Often the teletypes had to be acquired through secondary markets.

The Altair contained no operating system or other software in ROM, so starting it up required a machine language program to be entered by hand via front-panel switches, one location at a time. The program was typically a small driver for an attached cassette tape reader, which would then be used to read in a larger program. Later systems added bootstrapping code to improve this process and would run the CP/M operating system loaded from floppy disk.

=== Homebrew Computer Club ===
The Homebrew Computer Club was formed by Gordon French to gather together hobbyists interested in computing such that they could trade information. The first meeting was in March 1975 in Menlo Park in California and would include a demonstration of the Altair 8800.

The club was relatively influential in the development of early personal computers with several attendees subsequently having an impact on the industry. Noted members included Steve Wozniak, who attended the first meeting and later demonstrated the Apple I at the club and Ron Nicholson who was one the designers of the Amiga. Lee Felsenstein moderated club meetings and would design the Sol-20 and early portable Osborne 1 computer released by another club member Adam Osborne. Attendee Jerry Lawson would design the Fairchild Channel F game console.

=== Sol-20 ===
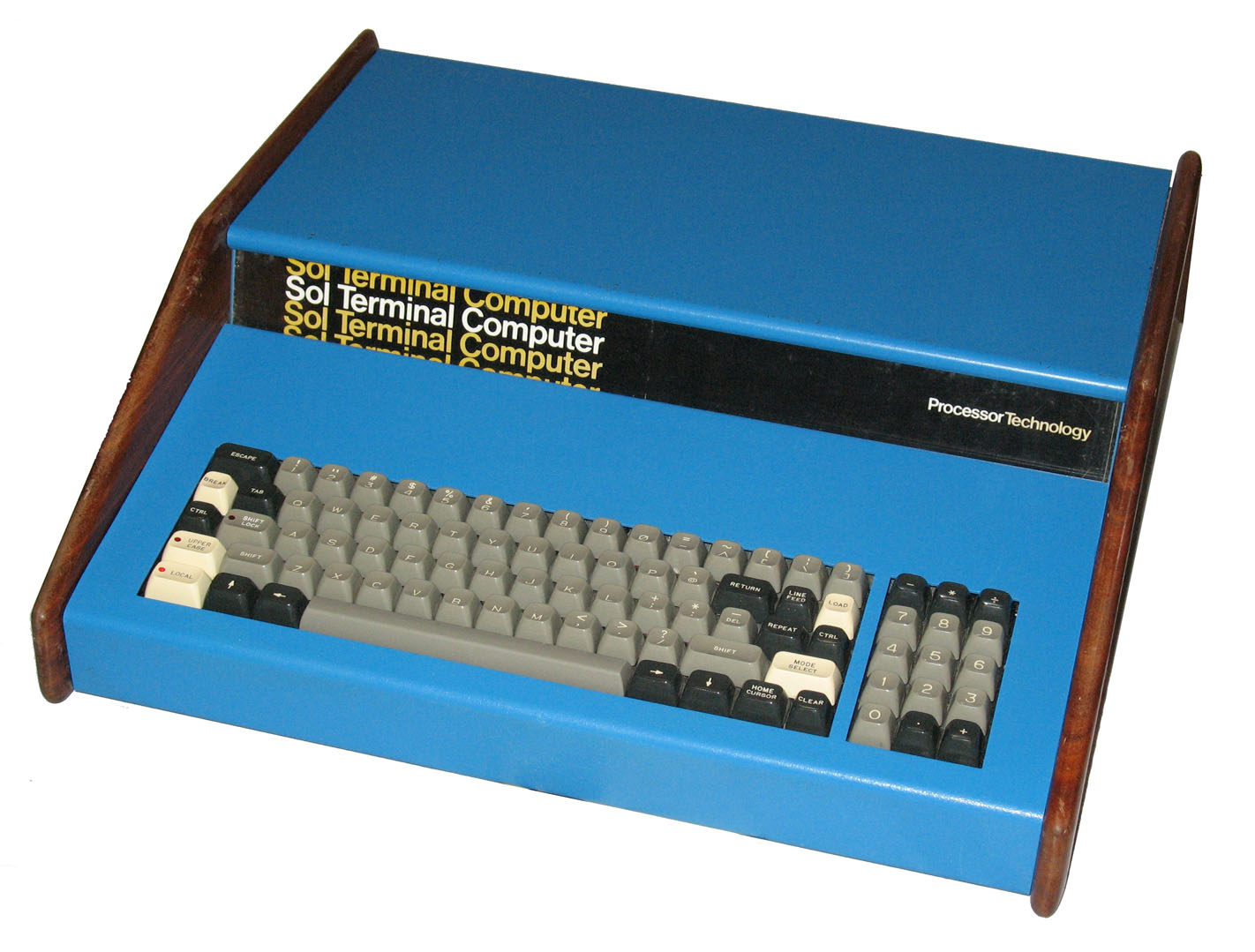
The Sol-20

The Altair 8800 was not an easy machine to use and did not ship as standard with peripherals or interfaces to enable interactive use as would be expected from a personal computer. The Sol-20 computer (released in 1976) would correct many of these deficiencies and assemble the required parts into a finished unit. The machine placed an entire S-100 system including QWERTY keyboard, CPU, display card, memory and ports into a convenient single box. The systems were packaged with a cassette tape interface for storage and a 12" monochrome monitor. Complete with a copy of BASIC, the system was priced at US$2,100 and up to 12,000 were sold.

=== BASIC and Microsoft ===
The BASIC programming language had been created in 1963 at Dartmouth College as a language intended for students not in scientific fields of study, in order to widen the appeal of computers. Previous languages were often quite difficult to learn and only those with a particular interest in computer science would do so. BASIC was well suited to minicomputers due to very low memory requirements and became a widely known language. The ease of use combined with low memory demands and widespread adoption made BASIC an attractive language for the microcomputers that would follow.

Paul Allen heard about the upcoming MITS Altair 8800 microcomputer kit in late 1974 from a magazine and showed it to his friend Bill Gates. The duo had experience with computers and had previously formed an enterprise that built a computer for processing city traffic data. They recognised the relevance that the BASIC language might have and boldly offered to demonstrate a BASIC for the Altair to MITS, despite having neither BASIC or access to an Altair.

Allen developed an Altair emulator for a minicomputer and with the assistance of friend Monte Davidoff they were able to write a BASIC interpreter on punched tape, which had 25 commands and fit in 4 KB of memory. Allen flew to Albuquerque, NM for a meeting with MITS and amazingly the interpreter worked despite never having been tested on a real Altair. Subsequently, Microsoft was founded in Albuquerque when MITS agreed to distribute BASIC. Microsoft would produce three different versions, adding an edition that required 8K of memory and an "expanded" edition with more features.

Microsoft was co-founded by Allen and Gates in 1976 to sell BASIC products to the personal computer market. New versions of Microsoft BASIC were produced with greater sophistication and BASIC was ported to several CPUs and architectures. Microsoft BASIC was widely used in many machines of the 1970s and 1980s including the Apple II and Commodore 64, although it was sometimes branded under a different name.

In many home computers BASIC was supplied on a ROM chip and it was commonplace for machines to start BASIC as standard as the first program the user saw on switching the machine on. While it was a popular implementation, Microsoft BASIC was not the only variation to be in use. The free Tiny BASIC was designed in 1975 as a direct response to Microsoft and many more would follow. Several computer manufacturers chose to supply their own BASIC with varying degrees of compatibility between them. BASIC software listings were commonly supplied with changes required for different microcomputer versions. In particular, methods of producing graphics and sound were rarely standard across BASIC implementations.

=== Other machines of the era ===
Other 1977 machines that were important within the hobbyist community at the time included the Exidy Sorcerer, the NorthStar Horizon, the Cromemco Z-2, and the Heathkit H8.

=== Video game consoles and the personal computer ===
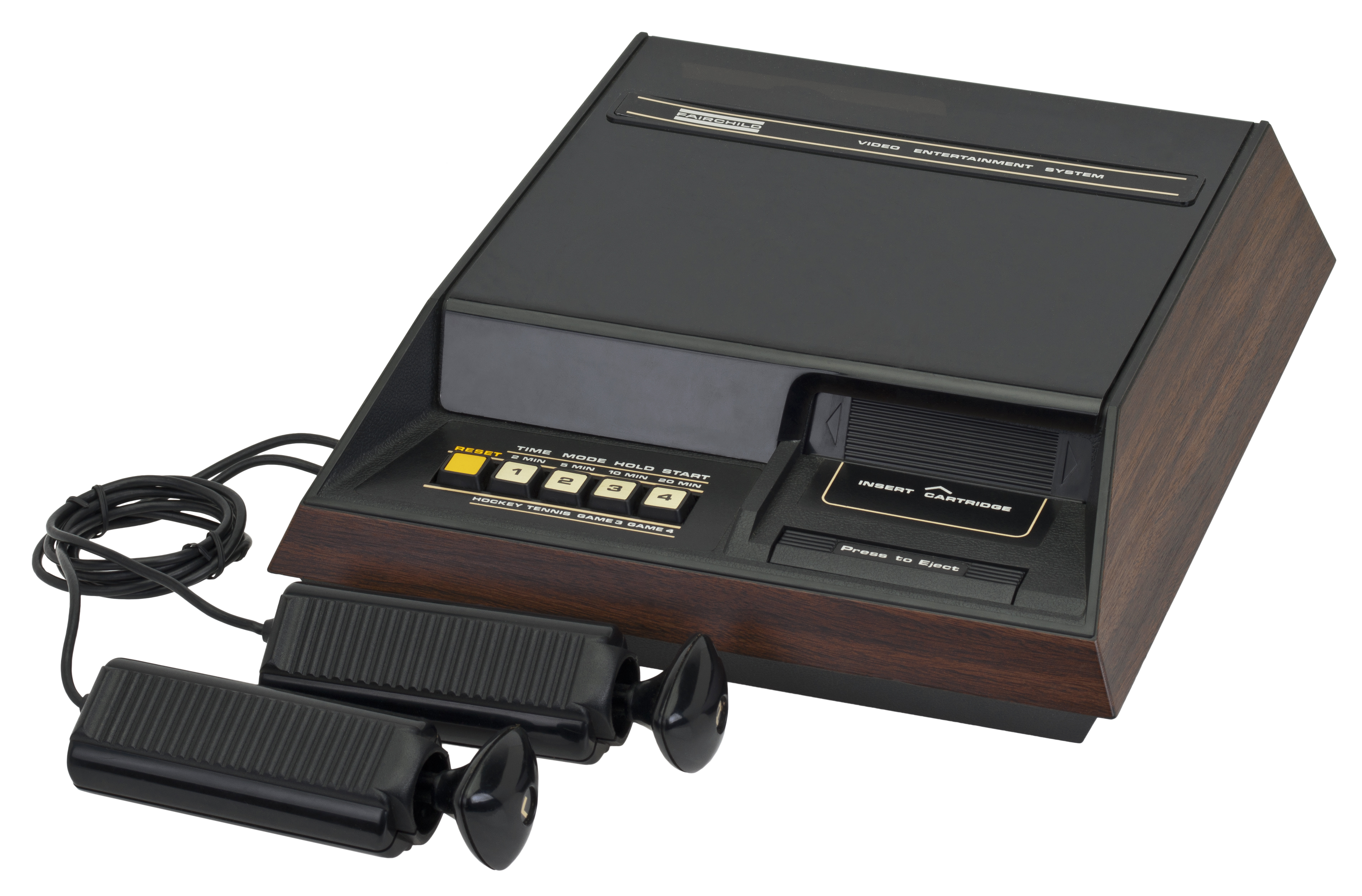
The 1976 Fairchild Channel F video game console

Programmable video game consoles emerged around the same era as personal computers started to become widely available. Game consoles had been on the market previously (such as the Magnavox Odyssey released in 1972 and Home Pong in 1975) but usually as custom devices that could only play a few games hardwired into the electronics. Increased levels of integration placed computer component prices within the affordable range for home entertainment devices and game consoles gained new capabilities. The Fairchild Channel F was released in 1976, which was CPU-based and used interchangeable ROM cartridges, then the more widely sold Atari 2600 was released in 1977.

Game consoles differ from personal computers in that they are not usually intended to be user programmable, do not include a keyboard input device (at least as standard) and are mainly intended for a single class of application and not general purposes software. However, in other respects the internal architecture of the machines is not usually dissimilar and game consoles can almost always in theory be used as a general purpose personal computer with the addition of relevant software and peripherals. In fact a few later game consoles would be essentially identical to released models of personal computers but just presented in a different format. The 1990 Commodore C64GS was similar to a Commodore 64 and the 1993 Amiga CD32 was similar to an Amiga 1200.

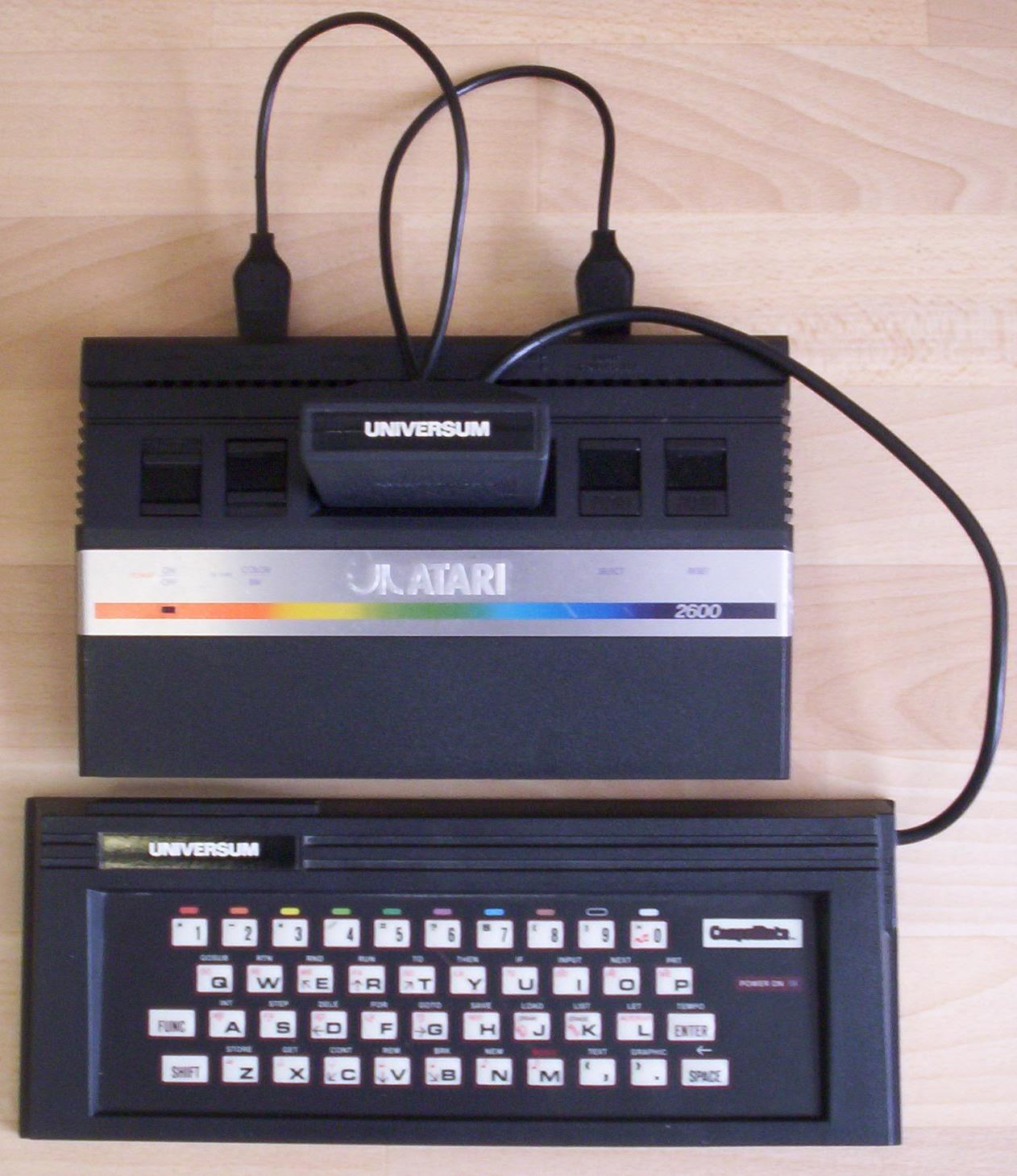
A German version of the CompuMate attached to an Atari 2600 Junior

Peripherals have been made available for several game consoles to convert the devices into a full personal computer. Even as far back as the Atari 2600, an adapter called the Atari Graduate was completed in 1983 that expanded the machine with a keyboard and I/O capabilities for use with storage devices. The Graduate was never sold but a similar 1983 adapter from a 3rd party called the CompuMate was released. An expansion module called Adam for the ColecoVision was released in 1983 that included a keyboard and storage capabilities (it was also available as a dedicated personal computer). A product called Family Basic was released for the Nintendo NES in 1984 with a similar aim.

The concept of conversion of consoles into personal computers has not disappeared in more recent times. The 2006 Sony PlayStation 3 was originally specifically intended to have the option of being converted into a general purpose personal computer using the OtherOS feature, although the capability was controversially removed in later models. Hardware hackers have routinely prided themselves in demonstrating that dedicated game consoles can be persuaded to run personal computer operating systems such as Linux in combination with general purpose software despite not being intended to do so. The line between dedicated game consoles and personal computers has also blurred with the devices gaining subsets of popular personal computer features such as video playback and internet browsing. On the other hand, some personal computers have adopted features from game consoles; one example is the 2022 Valve Steam Deck, a Linux-based personal computer intended for gaming with a form factor resembling a Nintendo Switch.

=== Cassette tape storage ===
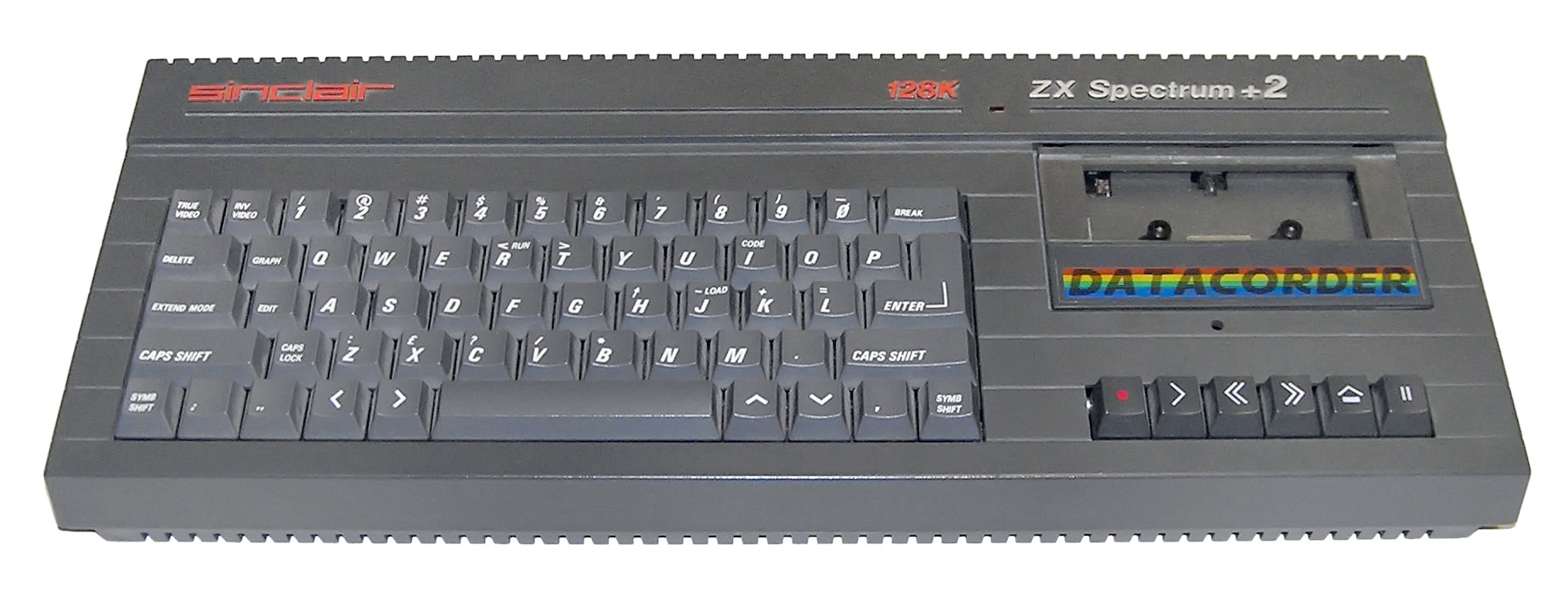
Sinclair ZX Spectrum +2 featuring an integrated tape recorder

The floppy disk drive was available through most of the history of the widely available personal computer and some form of floppy disk interface could usually be found for most machines. However, the peripherals were initially expensive, often costing as much as or significantly more than the computer itself. The cost of disk drives remained prohibitive to many potential buyers, particularly individual customers in the home computer market. Without a storage device a computer was of little use. Audio cassette tape filled the void for computer users on a budget whilst providing a storage density and convenience improvement over punched paper tape that had been used previously. Even the first IBM PC model, aimed at the relatively well financed business market, originally included a cassette interface out of concern that purchasers might be dissuaded by the price of a disk drive.

Audio cassette recorders were already found in the majority of homes and these could be simply interfaced to a variety of home computers. Many low-end machines would feature audio jacks for a cassette recorder. Some manufacturers chose to provide their own branded cassette unit (or provision a built-in device) but these were little different to any other audio tape recorder other that being pre-configured and sometimes transferring part of the necessary electronic interface from the computer into the cassette unit.

Loading software from audio tape was a slow process. Speeds of 300–1200 baud were typical and filling a tiny computer memory of only a few dozen kilobytes was a process lasting many minutes. Computer tape protocols often lacked the sophistication of forward error correction and loading errors were commonplace, resulting in the already frustratingly slow process needing to be repeated. Audio tape is not random access, when storing multiple files on a cassette the user would need to manually fast-forward the tape to the relevant location of the file to avoid waiting for the device to read the entire length of the cassette (which might be 30 minutes or more). To assist in the process a tape counter would be provided such that the user could note down the position of the file on the tape.

To reliably make use of audio tape, data was stored within the range of conventional audio bandwidth, this meant the same signal could be stored on any other audio storage medium. Audio tape data was occasionally found as a novelty on vinyl records and audio CDs (as audio, not as digital data and unrelated to CD-ROM). In modern times retro enthusiasts replay audio data into vintage systems using more reliable digital audio players.

By the end of the 1980s the cost of a disk drive had fallen to prices that fell within the budget of even the most cost conscious buyer and computer memories had exceeded the entire capacity of audio cassettes. Tape use consequently declined as a primary storage medium. Tape technology continued to advance though and high-density digital tape units remain in use in specialist data backup applications but less usually with personal computers.

== 1977 and the emergence of the "Trinity" ==
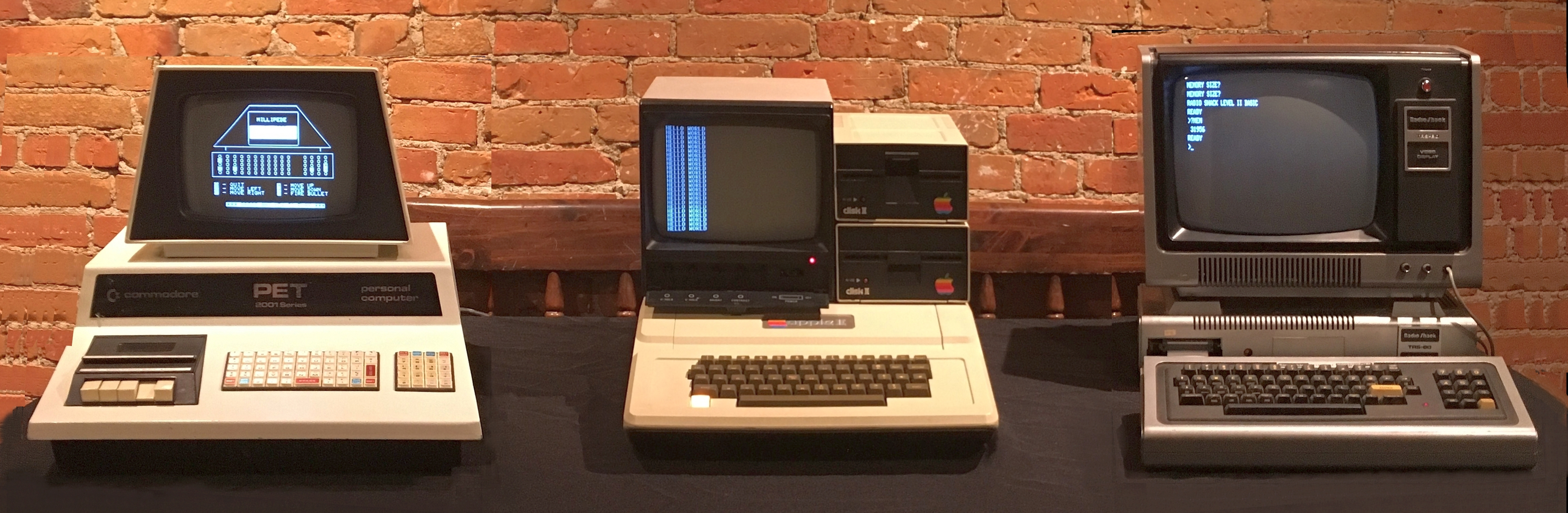
The three computers whose makers Byte magazine referred to as the "1977 Trinity" – from left to right: the Commodore PET 2001, the Apple II, and the Tandy/Radio Shack TRS-80 Model 1

In 1977, three personal computers were introduced that became the first widely successful mass-market personal computers: the Apple II, Commodore PET 2001, and the Tandy TRS-80. Each was sold as a complete computer with an integrated keyboard rather than as a kit requiring assembly, making them accessible to a broader range of users. By late 1978, they had become the dominant personal computers.

Byte magazine later referred to Commodore, Apple, and Tandy as the "1977 Trinity" of personal computers.

=== Apple II ===
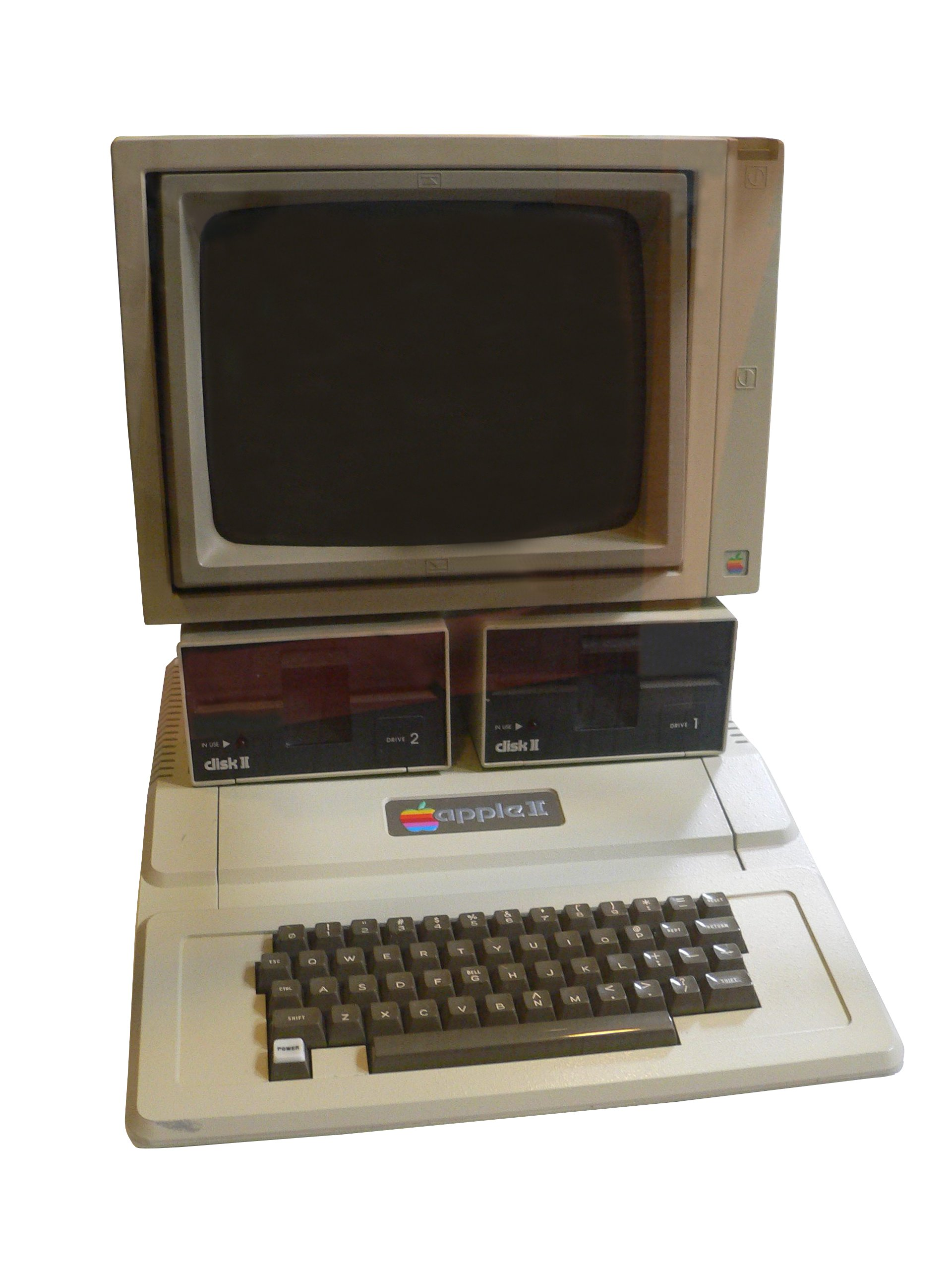
April 1977: Apple II shown with an Apple Monitor II (released in 1983) and two diskette drives

Steve Wozniak designed the Apple I, which he first demonstrated at the Homebrew Computer Club in 1976. Following an order for 100 computers from the Byte Shop, Wozniak, Steve Jobs, and Ronald Wayne founded Apple Computer.

Apple introduced the Apple II in 1977. Also designed by Wozniak, it was sold as a complete computer with a full QWERTY keyboard and a molded plastic enclosure, while the monitor and peripheral devices were sold separately. Priced at US$1,298, it was the most expensive of the "1977 Trinity", but was also the only model to support color graphics, bitmap graphics, sound, and internal expansion slots. Early models booted into the BASIC interpreter stored in ROM, and support for floppy disk drives was later added with Apple DOS, whose final release was Apple DOS 3.3.

The Apple II's relatively high price, limited retail distribution, and the absence of floating-point BASIC in early models contributed to lower initial sales than the PET 2001 and TRS-80. In 1979, it briefly surpassed the PET following the release of the VisiCalc spreadsheet, which was initially exclusive to the Apple II. Apple later fell to fourth place in unit sales after Atari introduced the Atari 400 and Atari 800.

Despite slow initial sales, the Apple II remained in production until 1993, substantially longer than the other members of the "1977 Trinity". By 1985, Apple had sold 2.1 million Apple II computers, and more than 4 million had been shipped by the end of production.

=== PET ===
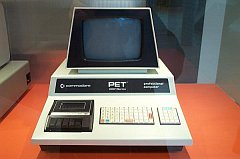
October 1977: Commodore PET

Chuck Peddle designed the Commodore PET (short for Personal Electronic Transactor) around his MOS 6502 processor. It was essentially a single-board computer with a simple TTL-based CRT driver circuit driving a small built-in monochrome monitor with 40×25 character graphics. The processor card, keyboard, monitor and cassette drive were all mounted in a single metal case. In 1982, Byte referred to the PET design as "the world's first personal computer".

The PET shipped in two models; the 2001–4 with 4 KB of RAM, and the 2001–8 with 8 KB. The machine also included a built-in Datassette for data storage located on the front of the case, which left little room for the keyboard. The 2001 was announced in June 1977 and the first 100 units were shipped in mid October 1977. However they remained back-ordered for months, and to ease deliveries they eventually canceled the 4 KB version early the next year.

Although the machine was fairly successful, there were frequent complaints about the tiny calculator-like keyboard, often referred to as a "chiclet keyboard" due to the keys' resemblance to the popular gum candy. This was addressed in the upgraded "dash N" and "dash B" versions of the 2001, which put the cassette outside the case, and included a much larger keyboard with a full stroke non-click motion. Internally a newer and simpler motherboard was used, along with an upgrade in memory to 8, 16, or 32 KB, known as the 2001-N-8, 2001-N-16 or 2001-N-32, respectively.

The PET line ended earlier than the other "1977 Trinity" machines because Commodore had moved onto other newer product lines that eventuated in the first computer model ever to sell 1 million units, the VIC-20, and the biggest selling single computer model of all time, the Commodore 64.

=== TRS-80 ===
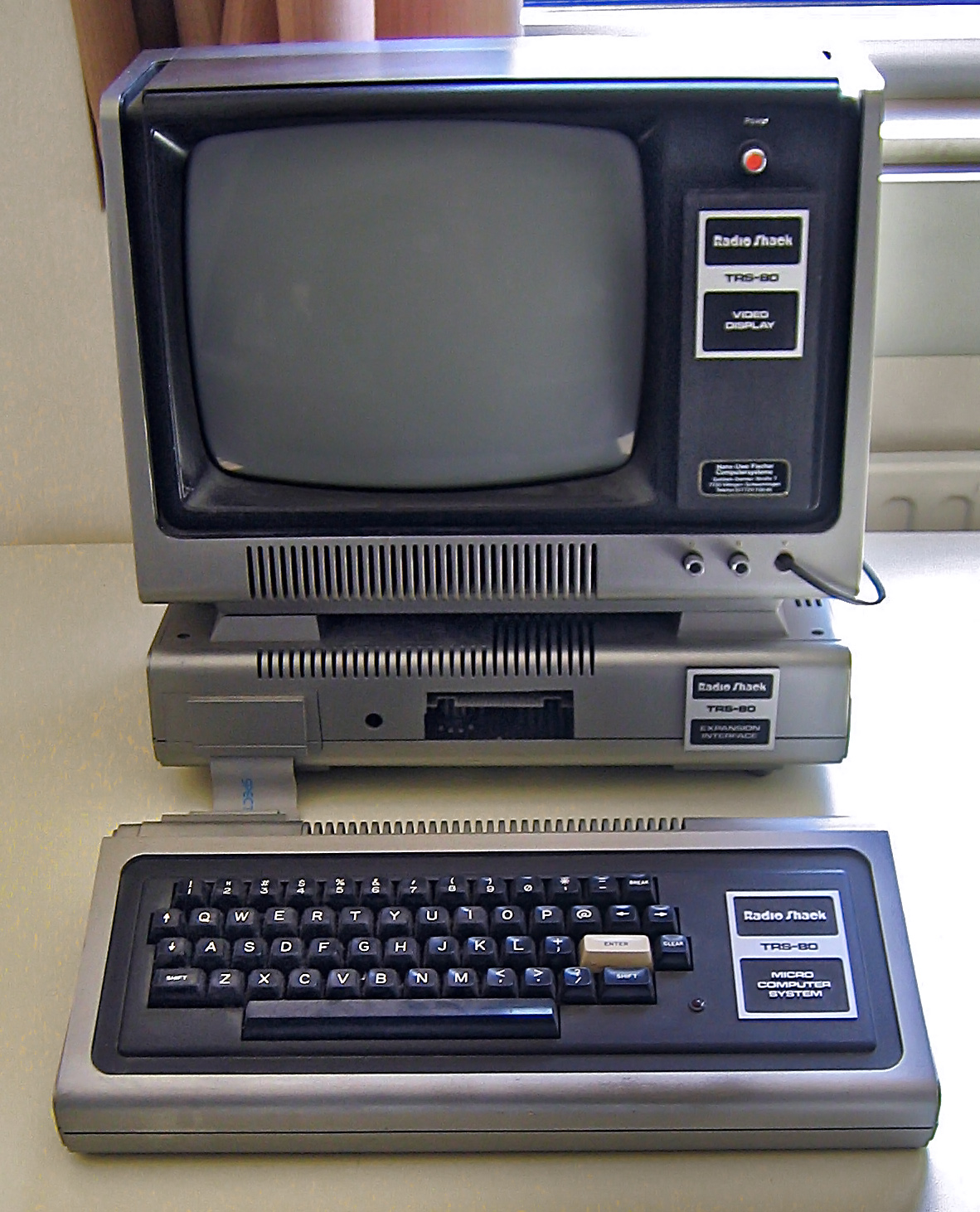
November 1977: TRS-80 Model I (with optional Expansion Interface beneath the monitor)

Tandy Corporation (Radio Shack) introduced the TRS-80, retroactively known as the Model I as the company expanded the line with more powerful models. The Model I combined motherboard and keyboard into one unit with a separate black-and-white monitor and power supply. Tandy's 3000+ Radio Shack storefronts ensured the computer would have widespread distribution and support (repair, upgrade, training services) that neither Apple nor Commodore could touch.

The Model I used a Zilog Z80 processor clocked at 1.77 MHz (later specimens shipped with the Z80A). The basic model originally shipped with 4 KB of RAM and Level 1 BASIC produced in-house. RAM in the first 4 KB machines was upgradeable to 16 KB and Level 2 Microsoft BASIC, which became the standard basic configuration. An Expansion Interface provided sockets for further RAM expansion to 48 KB. Its other strong features were its full stroke QWERTY keyboard with numeric keypad (lacking in the very first units but upgradeable), small size, well written Microsoft floating-point BASIC and inclusion of a 64-column monitor and tape deck—all for approximately half the cost of the Apple II. Eventually, 5.25-inch floppy drives and megabyte-capacity hard disks were made available by Tandy and third parties. The Expansion Interface provided for up to four floppy drives and hard drives to be daisy-chained, a slot for an RS-232 serial port and a parallel port for printers. With the (later) LDOS operating system, double-sided 80-track floppy drives were supported, and features such as Disk Basic with support for overlays and suspended/background programs, device independent data redirection, Job Control Language (batch processing), flexible backup and file maintenance, typeahead and keyboard macros.

The Model I could not meet FCC regulations on radio interference due to its plastic case and exterior cables. Apple resolved the issue with an interior metallic foil but the solution would not work for Tandy with the Model I. The Model I also suffered from problems with its cabling between its CPU and Expansion Interface (spontaneous reboots) and keyboard bounce (keystrokes would randomly repeat), and the earliest versions of TRSDOS similarly had technical troubles. Though these issues were quickly or eventually resolved, the computer suffered in some quarters from a reputation for poor build quality. Nevertheless, all the early microcomputer manufacturers experienced similar difficulties. Since the Model II and Model III were already in production by 1981, Tandy decided to stop manufacturing the Model I. Radio Shack sold some 1.5 million Model I's. The line continued until late 1991 when the TRS-80 Model 4 was at last retired.

=== The Japanese Trinity ===
Similarly to the American trinity, Japan has a term for their own most important machines of that era: "the eight-bit gosanke" (8ビット御三家, hachi-bitto gosanke). It consists of the Hitachi Basic Master (1978–09), Sharp MZ-80K (1978–12) and the NEC PC-8001 (announced 1979–05, shipped 1979–09). Each of these was the first of a series of machines from each manufacturer; NEC and Sharp continued these 8-bit lines into the late 1980s but Hitachi ended the series in 1984 as it was replaced in the gosanke by Fujitsu (see below).

== VisiCalc and the killer app ==
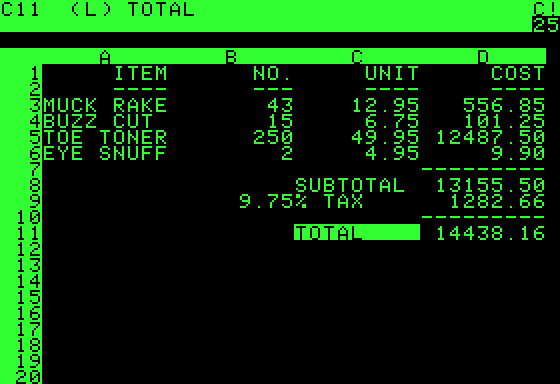
The VisiCalc spreadsheet is the first killer app.

Through the 1970s, personal computers had proven popular with electronics enthusiasts and hobbyists, however it was unclear why the general public might want to own one. This perception changed in 1979 with the release of VisiCalc from VisiCorp (originally Personal Software), which was the first spreadsheet application.

Spreadsheets were a common business tool prior to the personal computer but up until this time were created by hand. Updating a cell necessitated the manual re-calculation of all of the referencing cells. Dan Bricklin was watching a lecture at Harvard Business School where a spreadsheet was being tediously redrawn by hand and realised that the process could be automated with a computer.

VisiCalc proved exceptionally popular with the business community and ultimately 700,000 copies were sold. VisiCalc was initially released for the Apple II and was credited as being a key reason for the ultimate commercial success of the machine and by extension Apple Corporation, as it was exclusively available on the platform for the first 12 months which gave the hardware a sales lead over competitors. VisiCalc was retroactively described as the first "killer app" as it was in itself such useful software in business that it justified the purchase of personal computer hardware regardless of all other applications.

In an anecdote recounted by Chuck Peddle, VisiCalc could have easily been released for the Commodore PET first instead of the Apple II. VisiCorp owned four Commodore PET machines but had decided to try the Apple II market and purchased a single machine. In a twist of fate that may have changed the course of personal computer history, at the exact moment Dan Bricklin arrived, there was no PET available for use and so one of the founders of VisiCorp Dan Fylstra suggested that he should try the Apple machine as it had a similar BASIC.

== The early 1980s and home computers ==
Byte, in January 1980, announced in an editorial that "the era of off-the-shelf personal computers has arrived". The magazine stated that "a desirable contemporary personal computer has 64 K of memory, about 500 K bytes of mass storage on line, any old competently designed computer architecture, upper and lowercase video terminal, printer, and high-level languages". The author reported that when he needed to purchase such a computer quickly he did so at a local store for $6000 in cash, and cited it as an example of "what the state of the art is at present ... as a mass-produced product". By early that year Radio Shack, Commodore, and Apple manufactured the vast majority of the one half-million microcomputers that existed. As component prices continued to fall, many companies entered the computer business. This led to an explosion of low-cost machines known as home computers that sold millions of units before the market imploded in a price war in the early 1980s.

=== Atari 8-bit computers ===
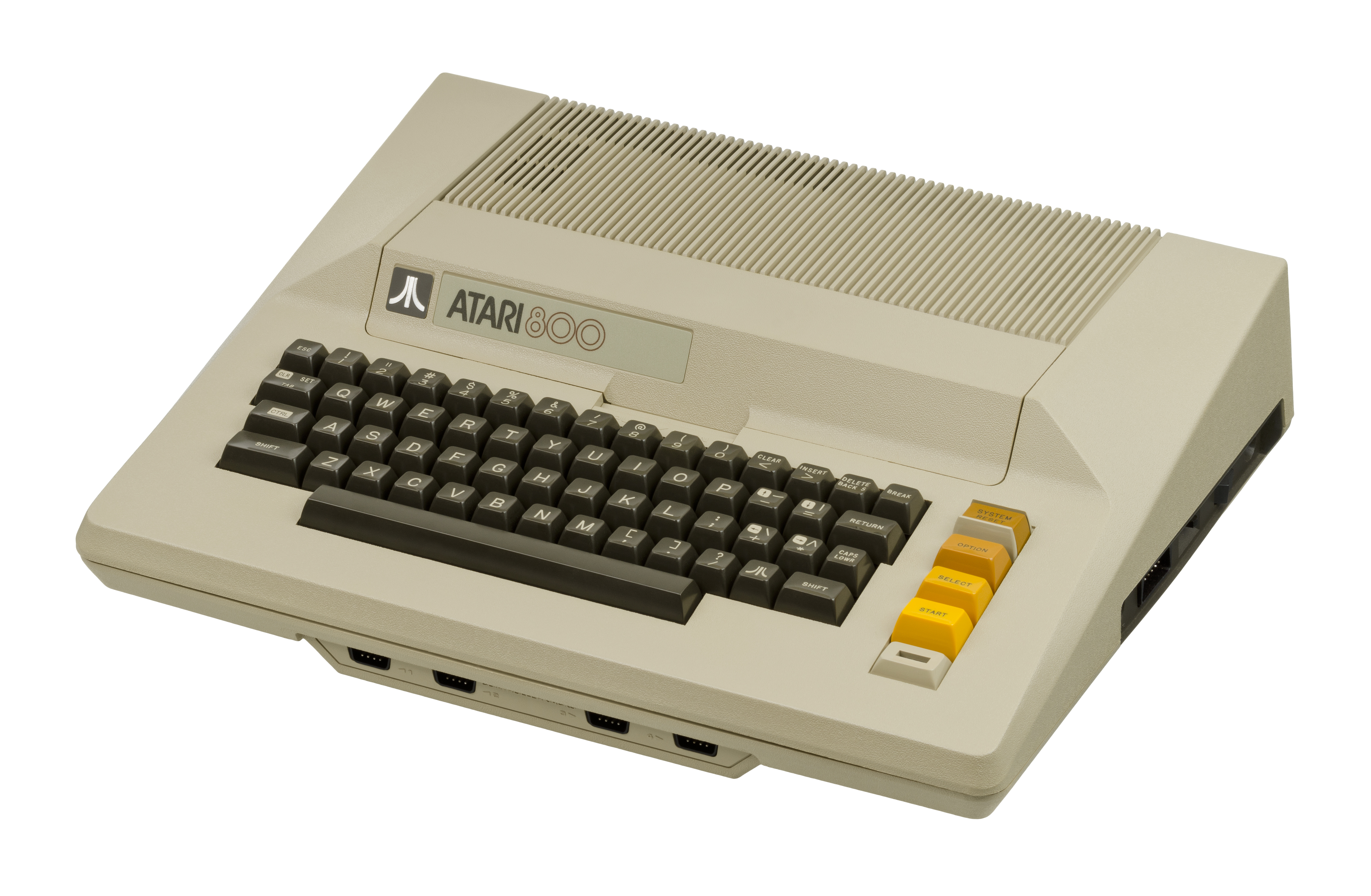
Atari 800

Atari, Inc. was a well-known brand in the late 1970s, both due to their hit arcade video games like Pong, as well as the hugely successful Atari Video Computer System game console. Realizing that the VCS would have a limited lifetime in the market before a technically advanced competitor came along, Atari decided they would be that competitor, and started work on a new console design that was much more advanced.

While these designs were being developed, the Trinity machines hit the market with considerable fanfare. Atari's management decided to change their work to a home computer system instead. Their knowledge of the home market through the VCS resulted in machines that were almost indestructible and just as easy to use as a games machine—simply plug in a cartridge and go. The new machines were first introduced as the Atari 400 and 800 in 1979, but production problems prevented widespread sales until the next year.

With a trio of custom graphics and sound co-processors and a 6502 CPU clocked ~80% faster than most competitors, the Atari machines had capabilities that no other microcomputer could match. In spite of a promising start with about 600,000 sold by 1981, they were unable to compete effectively with Commodore's introduction of the Commodore 64 in 1982, and only about 2 million machines were produced by the end of their production run. The 400 and 800 were tweaked into superficially improved models—the 1200XL, 600XL, 800XL, 65XE—as well as the 130XE with 128K of bank-switched RAM.

=== Sinclair ===
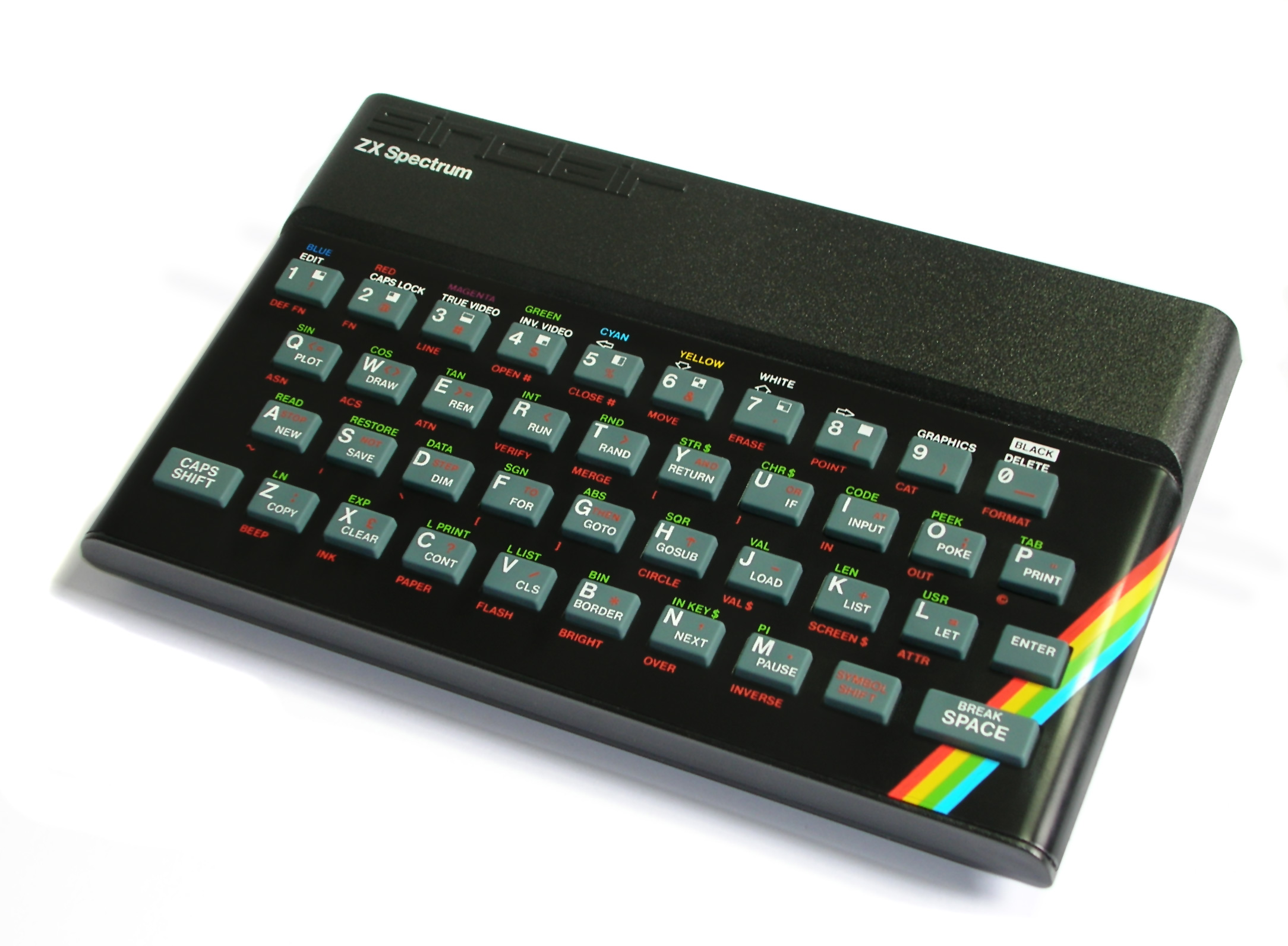
Sinclair ZX Spectrum

Sinclair Research Ltd was a British consumer electronics company founded by Sir Clive Sinclair in Cambridge. Clive Sinclair had originally founded Sinclair Radionics, but by 1976 was beginning to lose control over the company and started a new independent venture to pursue projects under his own direction. The new company was originally staffed by Chris Curry (later to co-found Acorn) who had interested Clive Sinclair in the computer market. Following the commercial success of a kit computer in 1977 aimed at electronics enthusiasts called the MK14, Sinclair Research (then trading as Science of Cambridge) entered the home computer market in 1980 with the ZX80 at £99.95. At the time the ZX80 was the cheapest personal computer for sale in the UK. This was succeeded by the more well-known ZX81 in the following year (sold as the Timex Sinclair 1000 in the United States). The ZX81 was one of the first computers in the UK to be aimed at the general public and was offered for sale via major high street retail channels. It would become a significant success, selling 1.5 million units.

In 1982 the ZX Spectrum was released, later becoming Britain's best selling computer, competing aggressively against Commodore and Amstrad. It would be followed by enhanced models in the form of the ZX Spectrum+ and 128. The ZX Spectrum series would sell more than 5 million units. The machine was widely used as a home gaming platform with more than 3,500 games titles eventually released.

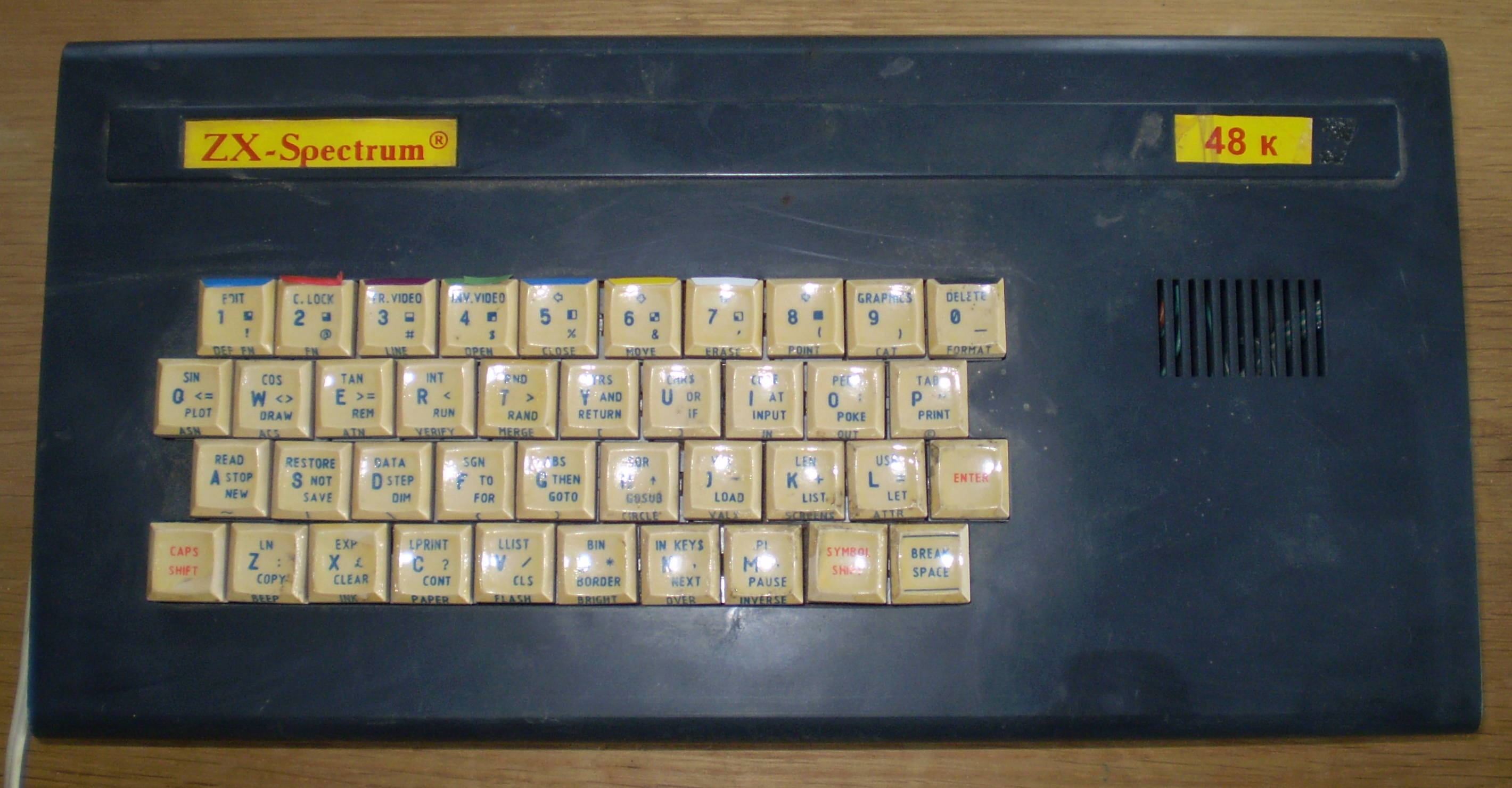
The Soviet Sonet Baltica ZX Spectrum Clone

The ZX Spectrum was extensively cloned in many countries, some machines with the involvement of Sinclair Research but large numbers with no official approval at all. The clones were particularly popular in Eastern Bloc countries, which at the time had only limited access to western markets, with dozens of Spectrum variants being produced.

The Sinclair QL was released in 1984. This machine was aimed at the serious home user and professional markets. It was a departure from the architecture of the ZX Spectrum series, using a Motorola 68008 processor and was not compatible with its predecessor. The QL was particularly distinctive due to an unusual choice of storage device. It was shipped with two integrated microdrives, a continuous loop tape system intended to have performance sitting somewhere between disk and cassette but at a lower price than a disk drive. The QL was not a commercial success, in part due to issues with reliability but also the ascent of the IBM PC in business with which it was not compatible. Production had been discontinued by 1985. The same technology was subsequently re-used in the ICL One Per Desk integrated telephone/computer device. The QL achieved some note due to Linus Torvalds crediting it with being the machine on which he became practiced at programming prior to developing Linux, in part due to the limited software support.

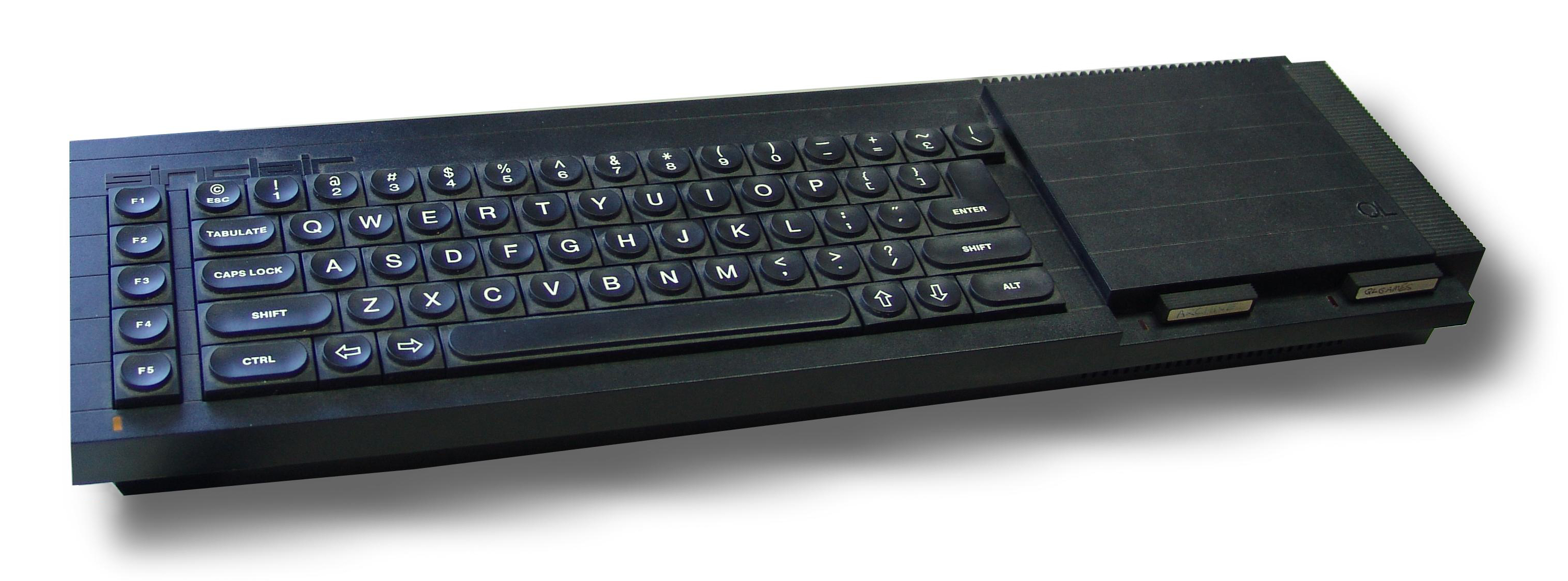
Sinclair QL

The combination of the market failure of the Sinclair QL and a portable TV product called the TV80 led Sinclair Research into financial difficulties in 1985. A year later Sinclair sold the rights to the computer products to Amstrad. Four further models in the Spectrum range would be released by Amstrad using the Sinclair brand name. The ZX Spectrum +2 included an integrated tape recorder and the +3 model incorporated a 3-inch CF2 disk drive. Production continued under Amstrad until 1992. Miles Gordon Technology attempted to release a successor to the Spectrum known as the SAM Coupé in 1989, but this was not a commercial success.

Sinclair Radionics would also independently design a personal computer, unrelated to Sinclair Research but with the involvement of Clive Sinclair. Following sale of the assets of Sinclair Radionics this design would eventually see production in 1982 as the Grundy NewBrain.

=== TI-99/4A ===
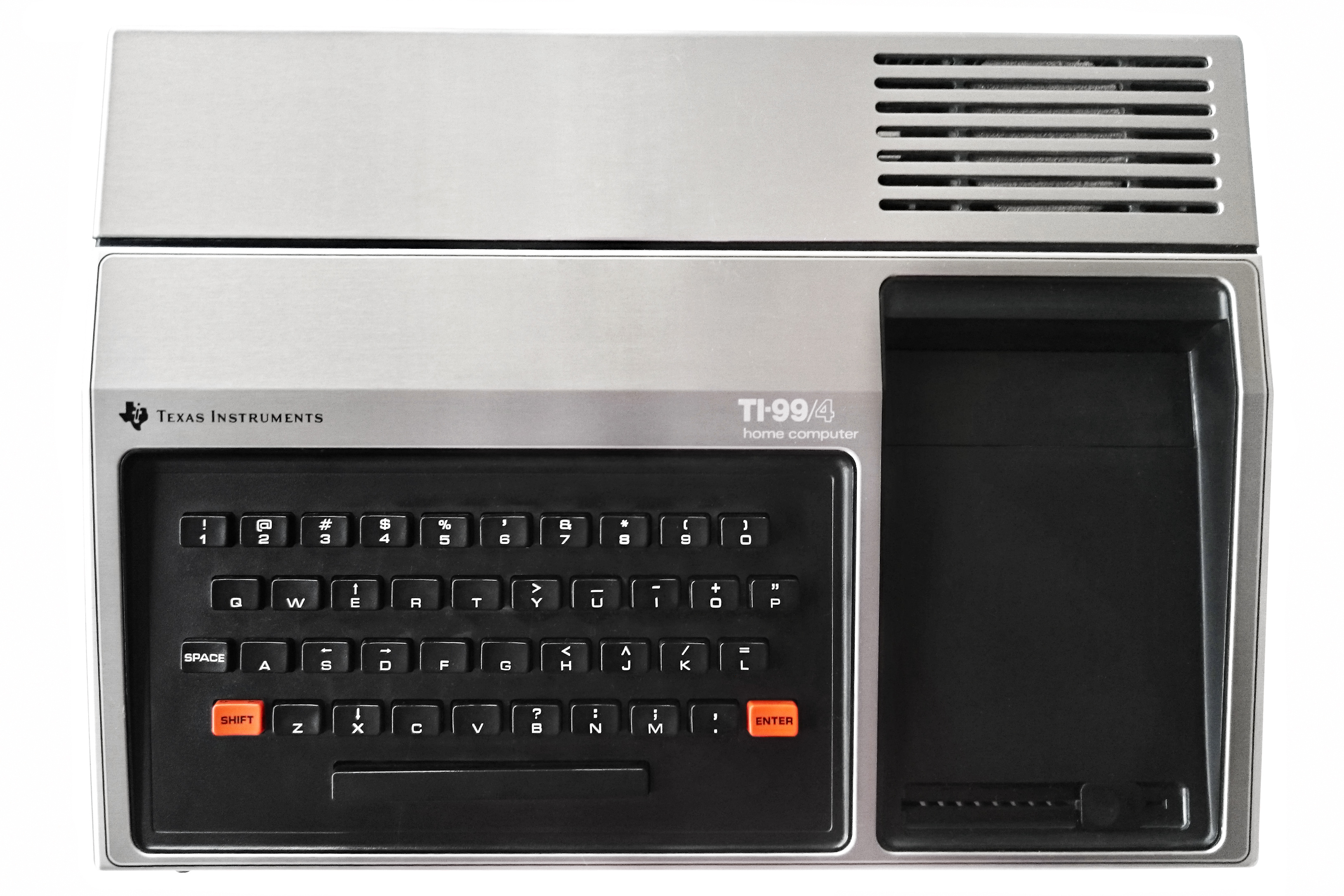
1979: the Texas Instruments TI-99/4

Texas Instruments, at the time the world's largest chip manufacturer, decided to enter the home computer market with the TI-99/4. The first home computer designed around a 16-bit microprocessor, its specs on paper were far ahead of the competition, and Texas Instruments had enormous cash reserves and development capability.

When it was released in late 1979, Texas Instruments initially focused on schools. Despite the 16-bit processor and custom video processor with sprite support, architectural restrictions prevented it from living up to expectations. It was updated to the TI-99/4A in 1981. A total of 2.8 million units were shipped between the two models, many at bargain basement prices resulting from a price war with Commodore in 1982–83, before the TI-99/4A was discontinued in March 1984.

=== VIC-20 and Commodore 64 ===
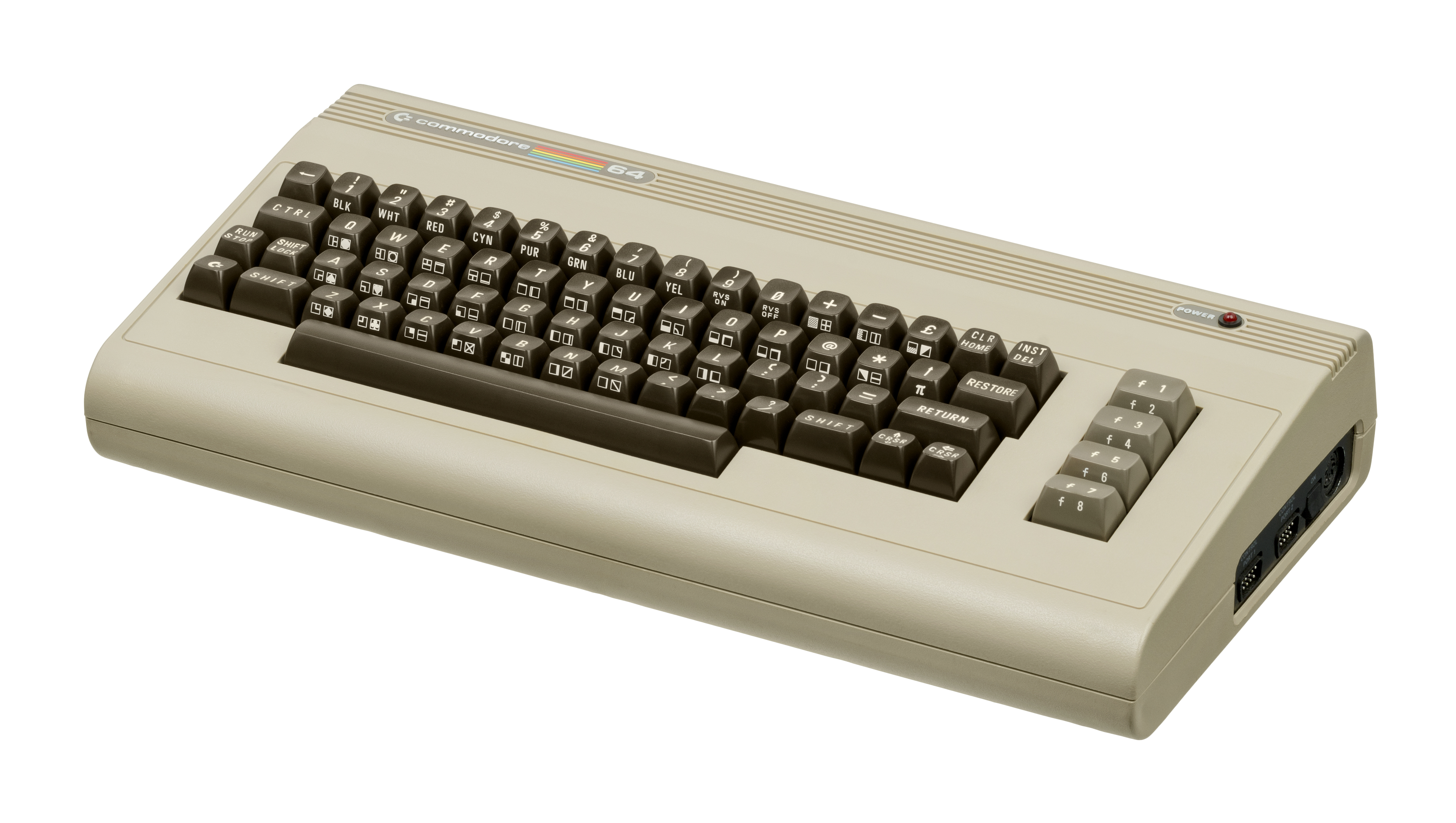
1982: Commodore 64

Realizing that the monochrome PET could not easily compete with color machines like the Apple II and Atari 8-bit computers, Commodore introduced the color VIC-20 in 1980 to address the home market. The machine offered only 5 KB of memory, which was small even for the time, however the use of more expensive SRAM reduced the complexity of the design versus cheaper DRAM which was more difficult to use. The distribution of games on ROM cartridge helped offset the small memory and RAM expansion cartridges were also released. The machine was sold at a cost competitive price and achieved strong sales, becoming the first personal computer to sell 1 million units and ultimately selling at least 2.5 million.

Commodore would address the memory limitations with the 1982 release of the Commodore 64, the name advertising the inclusion of 64 KB of memory, which was more comparable and in many cases exceeded contemporary home computers. The machine was based around the MOS 6510 and was particularly praised for the relatively advanced audio chip (the MOS 6581 or "SID") and competent graphics performance in a low cost package, which made it an ideal platform for games releases. At least 5,600 titles were ultimately released. Commodore's then ownership of the chip manufacturer MOS Technology was a factor in enabling the C64 to undercut competition on price as Commodore were able to be their own supplier of several key components. The machine was estimated by the Guinness book of World Records to be the highest selling desktop personal computer model of all time with somewhere between 12.5 million and 17 million units sold, with the record still standing in 2023.

=== BBC Micro ===
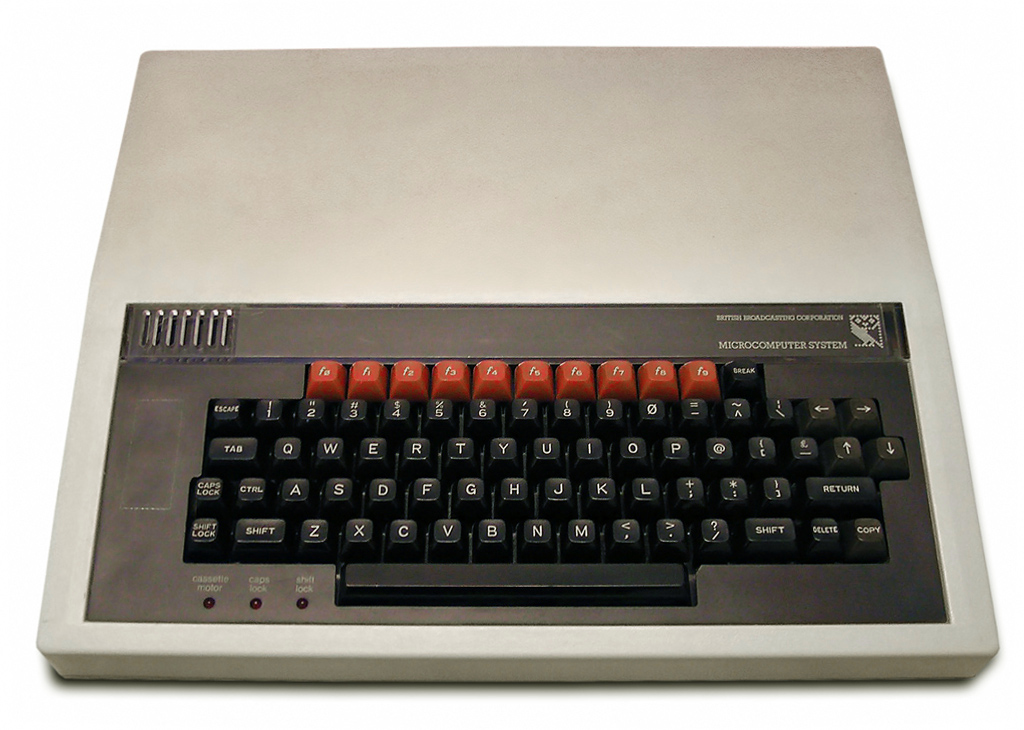
BBC Micro Model B

The BBC became interested in running a series of educational computer literacy TV programmes in the early 1980s and issued an invitation to tender for a personal computer to accompany the project. After examining several entrants, what was then known as the Proton from Acorn Computers was selected. A number of minor changes were made resulting in the BBC Micro (released 1981). The machine was MOS 6502 based and was originally sold as a choice of the model A with 16KB of memory or the more popular model B with 32KB. The machine achieved widespread success in the UK education sector and the system sold more than 1.5 million units. A cost-reduced version called the Electron would be released in 1983 and several other models would appear in the range including the BBC Master in 1986.

The BBC Micro included a number of innovative features less commonly seen on other contemporary home computers including local area networking in the form of Econet, which was widely deployed in education. A Teletext chip was standard and when combined with an adapter enabled software (known as Telesoftware) and other information to be downloaded from broadcast television signals.

The BBC Micro was architected to be multi-processor as standard. Additional CPUs could be connected via the included "Tube" interface which was designed for this purpose. Adapters for the Z80 and the 32-bit NS32016 CPUs would be released for the machine. Acorn subsequently used the Tube interface to develop the ARM processor (which then stood for Acorn RISC Machine) to power future projects and released an ARM development system for the BBC Micro. The CPU saw first commercial use in the Acorn Archimedes. ARM CPUs are now widely deployed in the majority of smartphones and tablet computers amongst a vast collection of other devices.

=== Commodore price war and crash ===
The current personal computer market is about the same size as the total potato-chip market. Next year it will be about half the size of the pet-food market, and is fast approaching the total worldwide sales of panty hose.

— James Finke, President, Commodore International, February 1982

In 1982, the TI 99/4A and Atari 400 were both $349, Radio Shack's Color Computer sold at $379, and Commodore had reduced the price of the VIC-20 to $199 and the Commodore 64 to $499 shortly after C64 release. In the early 1970s, Texas Instruments had forced Commodore from the calculator market by dropping the price of its own-brand calculators to less than the cost of the chipsets it sold to third parties to make the same design. Commodore's CEO, Jack Tramiel, vowed that this would not happen again, and purchased MOS Technology in 1976 to ensure a supply of chips. With his supply guaranteed, and good control over the component pricing, Tramiel launched a war against Texas Instruments soon after the introduction of the Commodore 64.

By 1983 the VIC-20 could be purchased for as little as $90. With a decreasing price and strong production, the VIC-20 continued to dominate Commodore sales through 1983 as interest in the C64 built. Commodore lowered the retail price of the C64 to $300 at the June 1983 Consumer Electronics Show, and stores sold it for as little as $199. At one point the company was selling as many computers as the rest of the industry combined. Commodore, which even discontinued list prices, could make a profit when selling the C64 for a retail price of $200 because of vertical integration, the practice of a company owning many of its suppliers. Particularly, the ownership of MOS Technology put Commodore in a dominating position as they were also a chip supplier to some of their competitors including Atari and Apple. Commodore's sharp and sudden price drops did not always please retailers who were left holding stock on which they would make a loss and Commodore was sometimes forced into compensating them.

Competitors also reduced prices in response to Commodore. The Atari 800's price in July was $165, and by the time Texas Instruments was ready in 1983 to introduce the 99/2 computer (designed to sell for $99) and the TI-99/4A sold for $99 in June. The 99/4A had sold for $400 in the fall of 1982, causing a loss for Texas Instruments of hundreds of millions of dollars. A Service Merchandise executive stated, "I've been in retailing 30 years and I have never seen any category of goods get on a self-destruct pattern like this." Such low prices probably hurt home computers' reputation; one retail executive said of the 99/4A, '"When they went to $99, people started asking 'What's wrong with it?'" The founder of Compute! stated in 1986 that "our market dropped from 300 percent growth per year to 20 percent".

While Tramiel's target was TI, many other competitors in the home computer market also experienced financial difficulties as a result of Commodore. Even Commodore's own finances showed strain from the demands of financing the massive building expansion needed to deliver the machines. Price cutting was one factor in Tramiel developing a rocky relationship with the main Commodore investor, Irving Gould. Due to a combination of other disagreements with Gould about management style, Tramiel surprised many by leaving Commodore in early 1984 despite his business strategy with the C64 ultimately being a substantial success.

=== Japanese computers ===
From the late 1970s to the early 1990s, Japan's personal computer market was largely dominated by domestic computer products. NEC became the market leader following the release of the PC-8001 in 1979, continuing with the 8-bit PC-88 and 16-bit PC-98 series in the 1980s, but had early competition from the Sharp MZ and Hitachi Basic Master series, and later competition from the 8-bit Fujitsu FM-7, Sharp X1, MSX and MSX2 series, and 16-bit FM Towns and X68000 series. Several of these systems were also released in Europe; MSX in particular gained some popularity there.

A key difference between early Western and Japanese systems was the latter's higher display resolutions (640x200 from 1979, and 640x400 from 1985) in order to accommodate Japanese text. Japanese computers also from the early 1980s employed Yamaha FM synthesis sound boards which produce higher quality sound. Japanese computers were widely used to produce video games, though only a small portion of Japanese computer games were released outside of the country. The most successful Japanese personal computer was NEC's PC-98, which sold more than 18 million units by 1999.

== The IBM PC ==
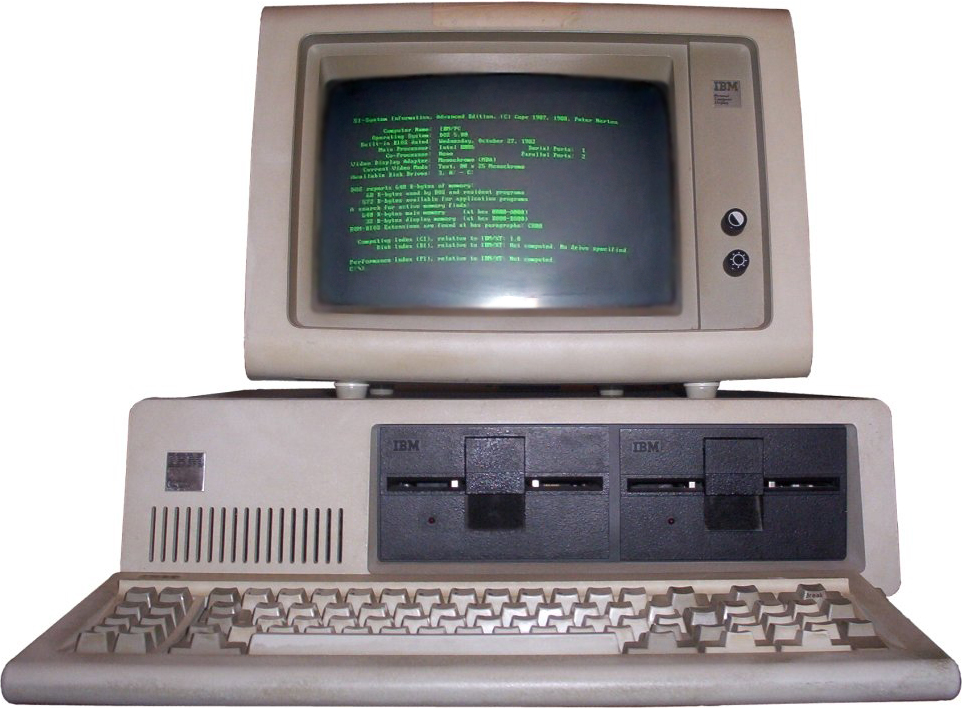
1981: IBM 5150

IBM was one of the largest computer companies in the world and it was widely expected that they would at some time enter the rapidly expanding personal computer market, which they did by releasing the IBM PC in August 1981. Like the Apple II and S-100 systems, it was based on an open, card-based architecture, which allowed third parties to develop for it. It used the Intel 8088 CPU running at 4.77 MHz, containing 29,000 transistors. The first model used an audio cassette for external storage, though there was an expensive floppy disk option. The cassette option was never popular and was removed in the PC XT of 1983. The XT added a 10 MB hard drive in place of one of the two floppy disks and increased the number of expansion slots from 5 to 8. While the original PC design could accommodate only up to 64 KB on the main board, the architecture was able to accommodate up to 640 KB of RAM, with the rest on cards. Later revisions of the design increased the limit to 256 KB on the main board.

In 1980, IBM had approached Digital Research (co-founded by Gary Kildall) for a version of CP/M for its upcoming IBM PC at the suggestion of Bill Gates of Microsoft, who was already providing a BASIC interpreter amongst other software for the PC. CP/M was a popular and widely supported operating system for personal computers at the time and would not have been an unexpected choice for the IBM machine. A long-standing industry myth persists that IBM were unable to negotiate a non-disclosure agreement with Dorothy McEwen, Digital Research co-founder and Kildall's wife, who handled much of the business side of the company and departed. In reality the barrier was overcome and Kildall did personally meet with IBM, notwithstanding a second myth that he was away flying his personal plane. He was actually at a pre-arranged meeting with a customer on the morning IBM arrived but was available later in the day. Kildall offered Digital Research's more advanced MP/M operating system but IBM were uninterested. Kildall then offered CP/M-86 but negotiations encountered difficulties when IBM demanded a flat licensing fee of $250,000 without a royalty. Digital Research more conventionally offered a deal of $10 per copy. Kildall was concerned about alienating the large number of other CP/M licensees and also with IBM's intent to re-brand CP/M as PC-DOS. Kildall ultimately believed he had reached a deal but IBM returned to negotiate with Gates who offered to provide 86-DOS (originally known as QDOS), an operating system similar to CP/M developed by Tim Paterson of Seattle Computer Products. IBM rebranded the Microsoft version as PC-DOS. Critically, IBM did not prevent Microsoft from reselling the DOS product to other vendors which would be key to Microsoft's future dominance in the operating system market.

When Digital Research became aware of the similarities between PC-DOS and CP/M they raised a dispute with IBM, who offered to resolve the matter by shipping the PC without bundling an operating system. Three operating system choices would be offered for separate purchase: PC-DOS, CP/M and UCSD p-System. Digital Research accepted this deal believing the market would choose their version given the large existing base of software support. However, IBM offered PC-DOS at only $40 but CP/M-86 was marketed at $240, which made the latter uncompetitive and porting software to PC-DOS was not difficult. Digital Research would later return to compete with MS-DOS in form of the compatible DR-DOS product in 1988, which achieved some success.

=== IBM PC clones ===
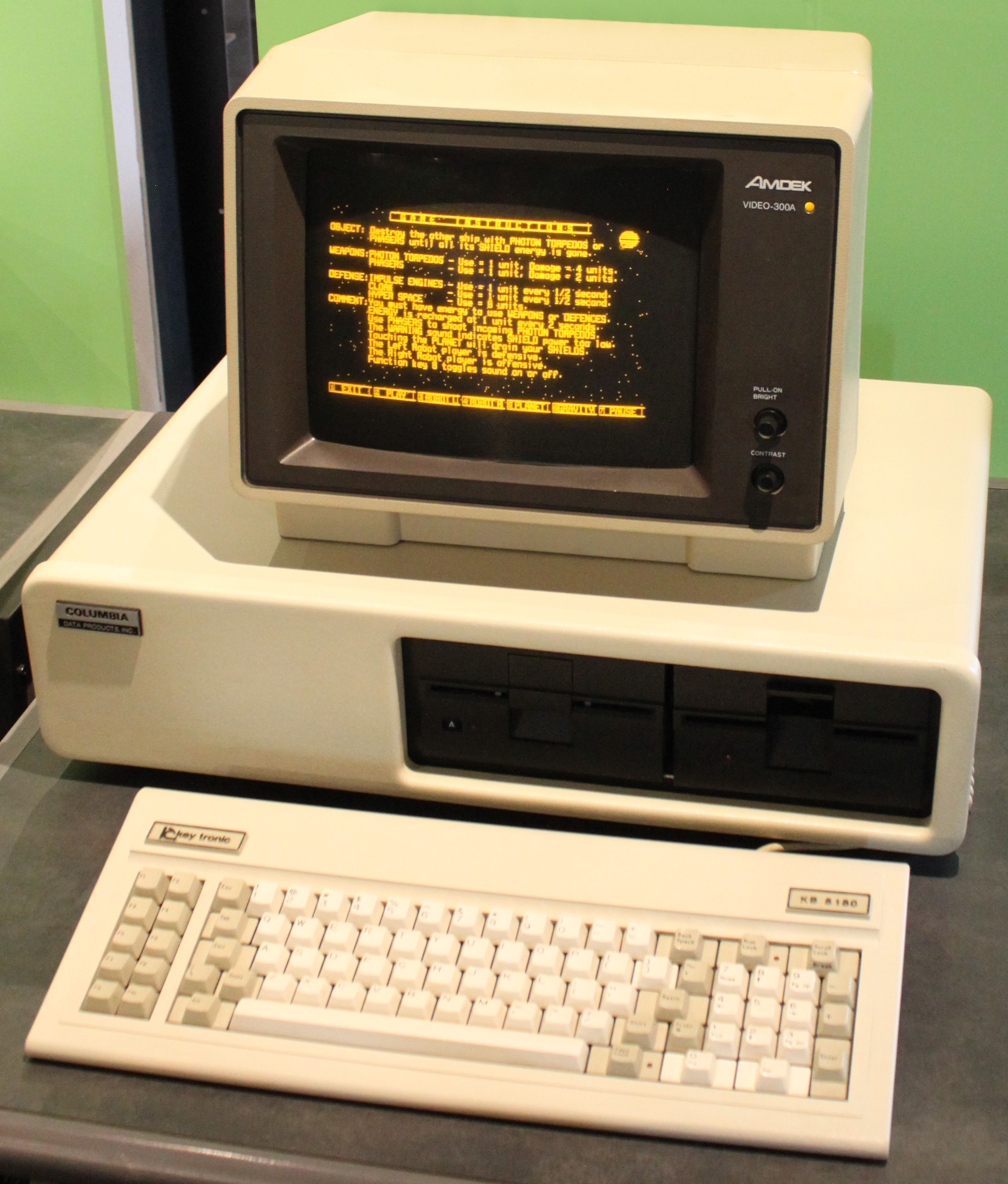
Columbia Data Products MPC 1600

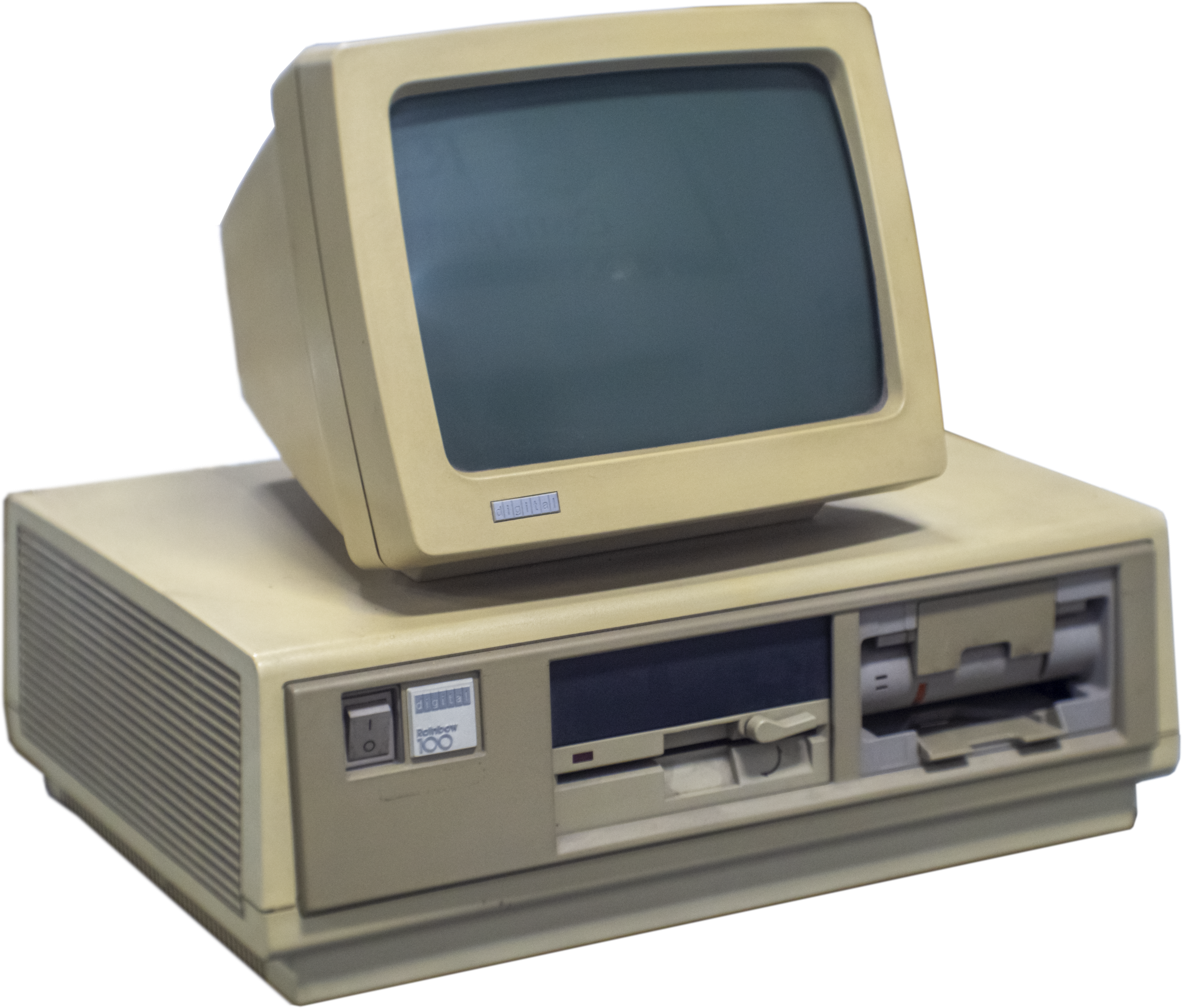
DEC Rainbow 100

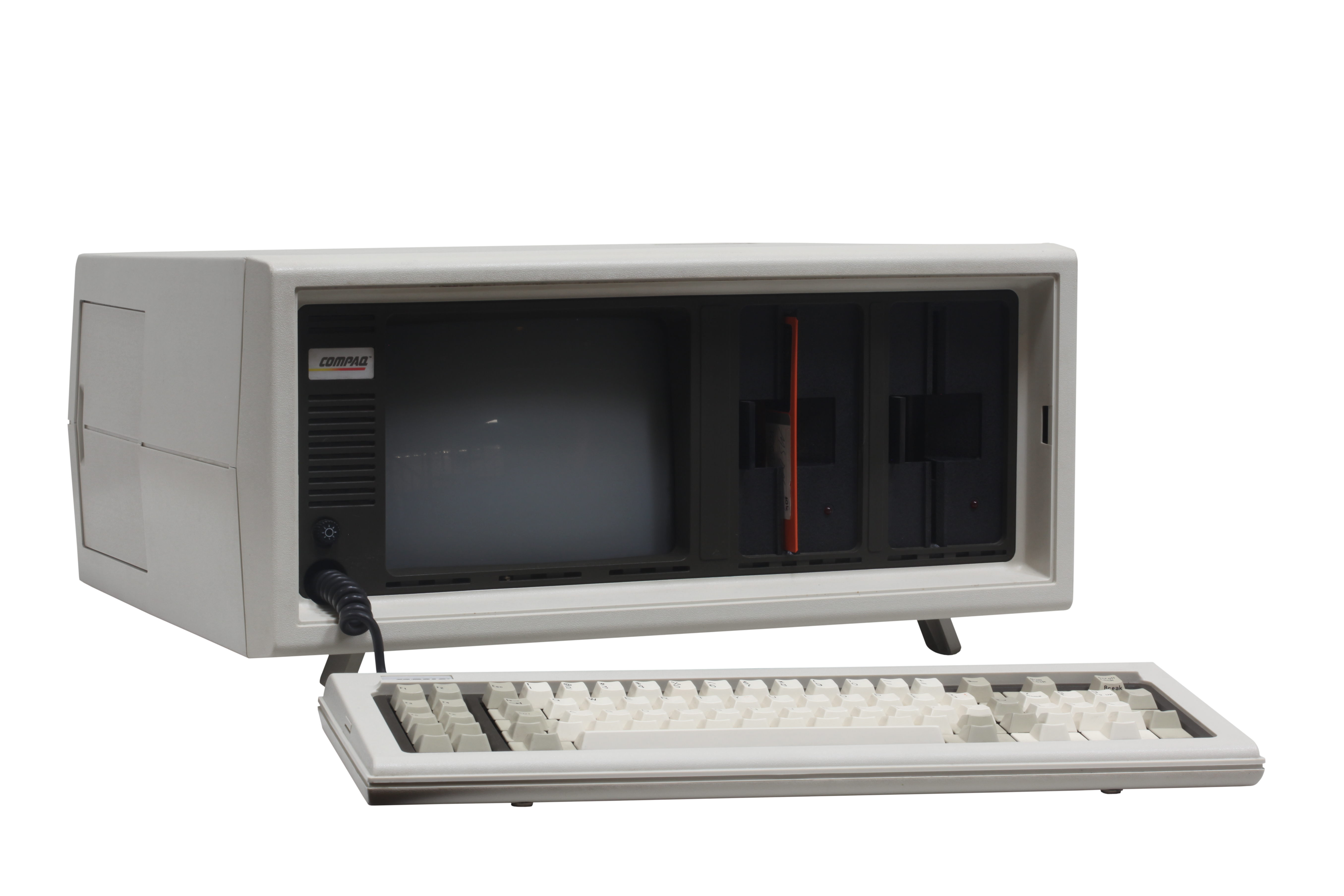
Compaq Portable

The marketing might of IBM made the PC platform an attractive prospect for clone makers as it would likely have significant success and other manufacturers could potentially take a slice of the sales. The idea of cloning computers was not new and the IBM was not the only platform that was a target of compatible makers. The Apple II was also copied, as were many successful preceding platforms back to the Altair. Larger and more expensive minicomputers were also regularly cloned by competitors.

Although the PC and XT included a version of the BASIC language in read-only memory, most were purchased with disk drives and run with an operating system, the most popular of which was the Microsoft supplied PC-DOS. Microsoft had retained the rights to re-sell PC-DOS separately to the IBM PC. When they sold the product it was branded as MS-DOS but was otherwise identical.

The IBM PC was based on easily available integrated circuits and the basic card-slot design was not patented. The only IBM proprietary portion of the design was the BIOS software embedded in ROM. Discovering how this worked was not difficult, since a full copy of the BIOS source code with comments and annotations was helpfully printed in the IBM Technical Reference Manual for the 5150. The only problem for clone makers was that it was copyrighted.

A method called clean room design was used to overcome the copyright issue and produce a functionally identical BIOS version that could be legally sold. Not all PC cloners would take this approach though with IBM alleging Corona Data Systems and Eagle computer amongst others used their copyrighted version. With the commercial availability of MS-DOS and acquisition of a BIOS possible, there were no further barriers to competitors producing IBM PC imitations.

Columbia Data Products released the MPC 1600 in 1982, which was the first clone of the original IBM PC model 5150, but with more RAM and more expansion slots. Also in 1982, DEC released the Rainbow 100 which could run several operating systems including MS-DOS.

In 1983 Compaq released the Portable, which was a (just about) portable version of the IBM PC specifically designed to fit within the requirements of airline carry-on luggage. The machine resembled the earlier CP/M based Osborne 1 portable PC. The Compaq Portable sold well and became strongly associated with the IBM clone industry.

A large number of other companies would release clones. Through the 1980s sources for every component of an IBM PC gradually became available at retail such that they could just be slotted together without any electronics production being needed. Any organisation of any size could now be in the clone business leading to a proliferation of tiny brands that came and went amongst the much larger names. IBM's pricing was undercut to the point where they were no longer the significant force in development, leaving only the PC standard they had established. Microsoft was however left in a strong commercial position, being a supplier to most of the clones and would begin offering OEM versions of MS-DOS aimed at small-scale system builders as opposed to larger companies in 1986.

In 1984, IBM introduced the IBM Personal Computer/AT (more often called the PC/AT or AT) built around the Intel 80286 microprocessor. This chip was much faster, and could address up to 16MB of RAM but only in a mode that largely broke compatibility with the earlier 8086 and 8088. In particular, the MS-DOS operating system was not able to take advantage of this capability. The bus in the PC/AT was given the name Industry Standard Architecture (ISA).

IBM's weakening position in the PC market was made clear with Intel's introduction of the 80386, which first appeared in a Compaq machine and not an IBM which made Compaq now seem to be leading the direction of the architecture. Compaq released the DeskPro 386 featuring the CPU in 1986. IBM would not sit idle and see the PC market disappear to the cloners. They would regularly take legal action (often successfully) against clone makers using their large portfolio of patents. In addition IBM launched the PS/2 range of computers in 1987 with the proprietary Micro Channel bus in an attempt to recapture control of the market through charging licenses for a key component, but this was not successful. It received only tepid support from 3rd parties and PC cloners largely stuck with ISA until the short-lived VESA Local Bus and then Peripheral Component Interconnect (PCI) was released in 1992.

== Apple Lisa and Macintosh ==
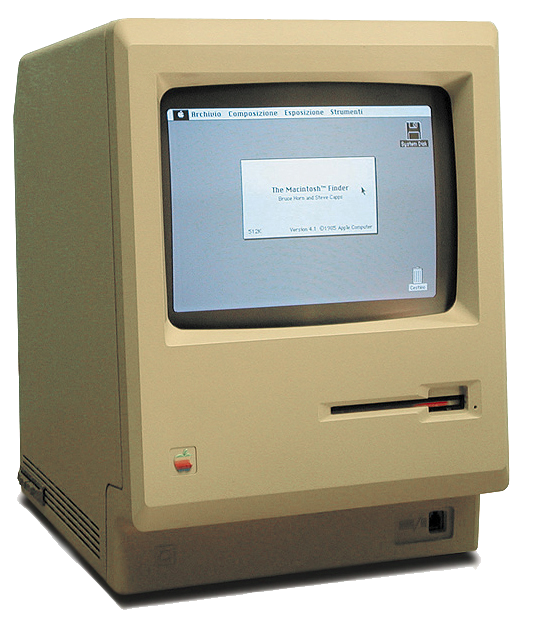
1984: Apple Macintosh

In 1983 Apple Computer introduced the first mass-marketed microcomputer with a graphical user interface, the Lisa. The Lisa ran on a Motorola 68000 microprocessor and came equipped with 1 megabyte of RAM, a 12-inch (300 mm) black-and-white monitor, dual 5¼-inch floppy disk drives and a 5 megabyte Profile hard drive. The Lisa's slow operating speed and high price (US$10,000), however, led to its commercial failure.

Drawing upon its experience with the Lisa, Apple launched the Macintosh in 1984, with an advertisement during the Super Bowl. The Macintosh was the first successful mass-market mouse-driven computer with a graphical user interface or 'WIMP' (Windows, Icons, Menus, and Pointers). Based on the Motorola 68000 microprocessor, the Macintosh included many of the Lisa's features at a price of US$2,495. The Macintosh was introduced with 128 KB of RAM and later that year a 512 KB RAM model became available. To reduce costs compared the Lisa, the year-younger Macintosh had a simplified motherboard design, no internal hard drive, and a single 3.5-inch floppy drive. Applications that came with the Macintosh included MacPaint, a bit-mapped graphics program, and MacWrite, which demonstrated WYSIWYG word processing.

While not a success upon its release, the Macintosh was a successful personal computer for years to come. This is particularly due to the introduction of desktop publishing in 1985 through Apple's partnership with Adobe. This partnership introduced the LaserWriter printer and Aldus PageMaker to users of the personal computer. Shortly after the departures of Steve Jobs and Steve Wozniak from Apple in 1985, a number of different models of Macintosh, including the Macintosh Plus and Macintosh II, were released to a great degree of success. The entire Macintosh line of computers was IBM's major competition up until the early 1990s.

== Amiga ==
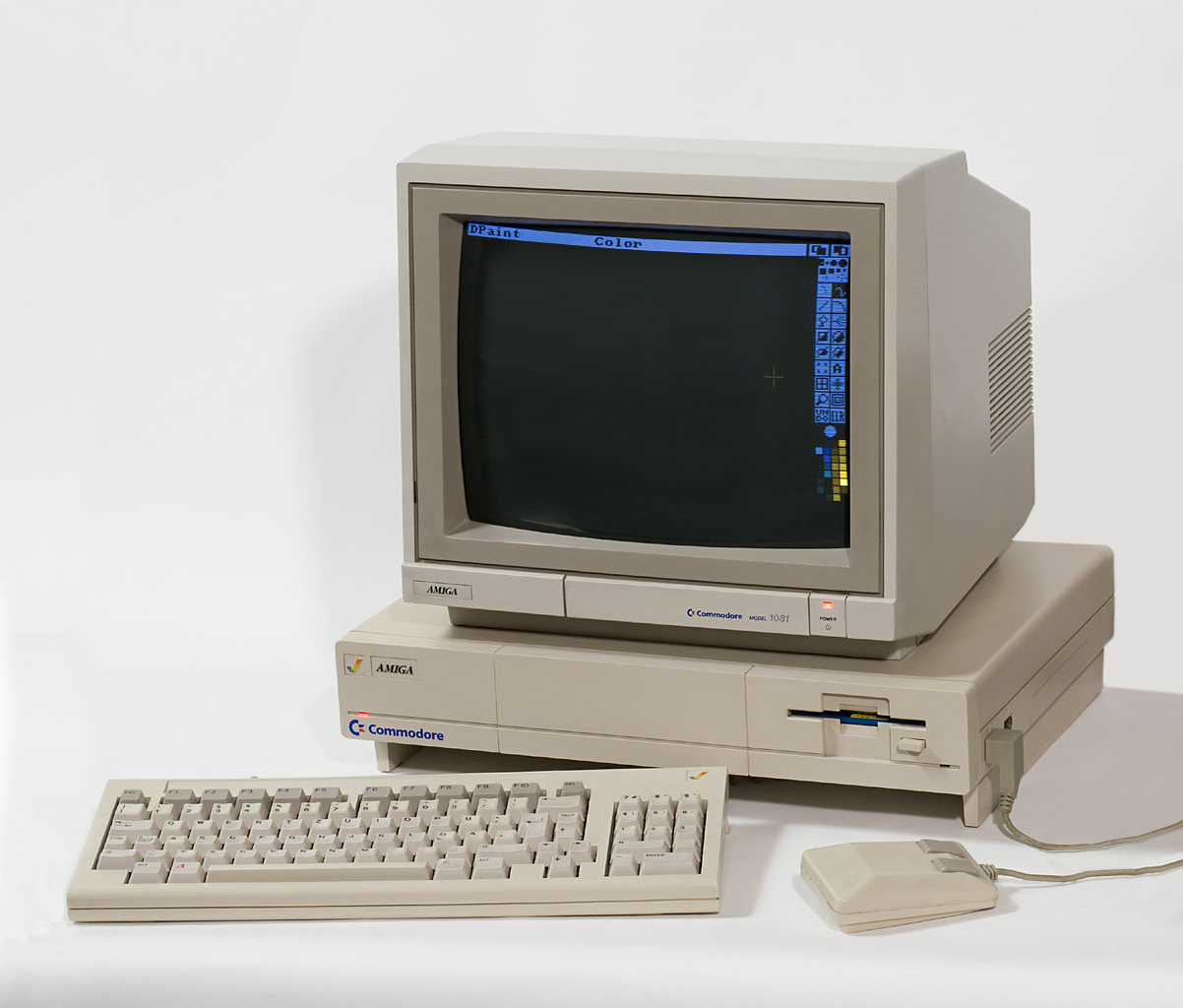
Amiga 1000

The Amiga was a range of computers first released in 1985 by Commodore with high performance graphics and audio capabilities. The machines found particular success as gaming platforms and also in video production. The Amiga achieved popularity in several European countries in the late 1980s and early 1990s, selling around 4.8 million units. Sales were comparatively muted in North America but it did find some niches in this region.

The Amiga computers were originally conceived as a game console. Activision games co-founder Larry Kaplan had seen a preview of the Nintendo NES in 1982 and wanted to produce a more capable machine. He first contacted Atari employee Doug Neubauer who had worked on the sound chip for the Atari 8-bit home computer range and then later recruited Jay Miner who had also worked on the graphics chip for the same machines. They formed Hi-Toro corporation to develop the new console, later to be renamed Amiga. Kaplan and Neubauer would drop out and be replaced by Ron Nicholson from Apple and Joe Decuir who had worked for Atari. They first sold a range of peripherals to raise money for the new venture. By 1983 Amiga were running out of money and approached Atari for extra financing, which was agreed. By 1984 Atari was losing money and Amiga had a clause in their contract with Atari that they could buy-out control of the machine for half a million dollars. Commodore was looking for a new design to replace the C64 and agreed to finance this. Amiga development subsequently moved to Commodore.

The Amiga machines introduced a sophisticated set of custom chips that allowed the relatively slow CPUs of the time to accelerate graphics operations. One of the key functions was the blitter, which was suggested by Nicholson, and would be central to the graphical performance of the Amiga. This was a chip for moving blocks of data at high speed and could also concurrently modify and combine blocks in various ways. This allowed regions of graphics to be copied very rapidly around the display without the involvement of the CPU. The concept wasn't new, it originally came from the Xerox Alto and had been used previously in the Mindset computer (1984), but was popularised by the Amiga. The blitter was used to effect in a 1984 Amiga industry demo featuring a pseudo-3D rotating checkered ball, later to be known as the "boing ball" and would become associated with the Amiga brand. The fluidity of motion of a graphic of that size had not been seen on any other cost competitive machines of the era. Competitors allowed only comparatively tiny sprites to be drawn with any speed. Hardware blitter would become a standard feature in the industry going forwards.

A typical IBM PC clone of the era displayed 16 colors at best and more usually only 4 from a fixed palette. The Amiga offered 4096 colours with up to 64 colors on screen at once, but through a clever hardware trick called "HAM mode" it was possible to display all 4096 colors on screen simultaneously in some situations. This was an unprecedented feat on any machine in the same price bracket and enabled the novelty of displaying photo-realistic images on an affordable home computer. Another innovation was the inclusion of a genlock capability which allowed Amiga graphics to be mixed with a television video signal. This allowed the Amiga to be competitive in video production against more expensive rivals. The Amiga also included a complete graphical pre-emptive multi-tasking operating system called Workbench. Competing GUI operating systems were only beginning to gain momentum at the time and often did not allow several programs to be run at once.

The Commodore Amiga 1000 was launched as a desktop personal computer in 1985 at an event featuring the artist Andy Warhol and the singer Debbie Harry (known professionally as Blondie). The machine featured a Motorola 68000 processor and 256KB of RAM in combination with the custom chips. The series would reach its height with the release of the cost reduced A500 version in 1987, which was not discontinued until 1992. The series would be joined by several other models including versions aimed at the high-end graphics and video markets such as the Amiga 3000 (1990). Into the CD-ROM era, a home appliance version was produced in the form of the CD-TV (1991) and a dedicated game console version known as the CD32 (1993). The Amiga range ended with the bankruptcy of Commodore in 1994, but the series continues to have a cult following from enthusiasts.

== The rise of the graphical user interface ==
The now ubiquitous WIMP (Windows, Icons, Menus and Pointers) graphical user interface style was developed from research ideas (pioneered by Douglas Engelbart) into a fully functional product by Xerox PARC in the early 1970s. In 1981, Xerox released the Xerox Star as a commercial product which featured a full graphical user interface with a bitmapped display. The Star was developed from the Xerox Alto developed in 1972. With a release price of over $16,000 the Star was not within the range of most personal computer buyers.

The British graphics company Quantel had released the GUI driven Paintbox product in 1981 which became a staple of the television industry through the 1980s. This was an extremely expensive personal computer intended for a very specific market segment (graphics design) and not for the general public.

A number of Apple employees were shown the work of Xerox and this heavily influenced the GUI driven Apple Lisa, released in 1983. Concurrently to the Lisa, VisiCorp (noted for the VisiCalc spreadsheet) was working on the Visi On GUI environment (first demonstrated at COMDEX in 1982) and released their version for the IBM PC in 1983. Neither the Lisa nor Visi On was a significant commercial success as both required expensive hardware. The Apple Lisa was followed by the first of the more successful Macintosh range in 1984 which had cut the hardware costs for running a GUI to a more palatable level.

It was commonplace for individual software releases to feature elements of a GUI in the 1980s without requiring any specific GUI based operating system to be installed. Many programs used a mouse and had menus and icons but each program would have its own style and there was no consistent look and feel. The user would have to learn how to use each title separately as opposed to intuitively understanding it. There were also no standards or consistency in the types of pointing device supported and a particular brand of mouse may or may not work. The rise of GUI based operating systems would bring consistency to the user experience and also deliver a toolbox of useful library routines for software to draw upon. Each individual software title would no longer have to code the routines necessary to draw a window or fonts in varying sizes.

X Window System for Unix emerged around June 1984 (derived from the earlier W windowing environment). At the time, Unix personal computers were not commonly encountered by the general public, being mostly in the form of very expensive workstations found in academia and specialist applications. X Window System continued to be the dominant windowing implementation on Unix-like operating systems and is still widely deployed as the underlying windowing system in many Linux distributions today.

Tandy released a primitive GUI for their range of PCs called DeskMate in 1984. Microsoft Windows 1.0 was released in 1985 but at this stage offered only very limited functionality (not even supporting overlapping windows) and had little market impact until version 3.0 released in 1990. Thereafter Windows started to gain ground and become the dominant windowing operating system for IBM clones.

Digital Research GEM (Graphics Environment Manager) is a capable WIMP GUI released in 1985 for multiple platforms including the Atari ST which shipped with GEM as standard. A number of Amstrad PCs shipped with GEM for DOS. Despite not being the inventors of the WIMP interface style, Apple would sue Digital Research resulting in a settlement that reduced the capabilities of GEM in 1986. The final retail release was in 1988.

The Commodore Amiga range of machines included a WIMP GUI called Workbench as standard in 1985. A GUI was also available for the Commodore 64, known as GEOS. The Acorn Archimedes range was supplied with the Arthur GUI in 1987, later to be known as RISC OS.

IBM developed their own windowing operating system, in collaboration with Microsoft, called OS/2 to coincide with the release of the IBM PS/2 range of PCs. OS/2 was released in 1987 and gained a GUI with version 1.1 in 1988. It would later become known as OS/2 Warp. Microsoft and IBM had ended their collaboration on the project by 1992 due to a commercial dispute and Microsoft had shifted focus to their own MS Windows platform. With MS Windows usually being bundled with PCs, OS/2 failed to gain significant market traction with the exception of specific market niches where IBM had dominance, such as in finance.

BeOS is a windowing operating system developed by Be Inc. which was founded by Jean-Louis Gassée, a former Apple executive. It was strongly considered as a replacement for the ailing Mac OS System 7 after Apple's internal project Copland (intended to be MacOS System 8) encountered difficulties. Commercial negotiations between Apple and Be Inc. ultimately failed. Apple co-founder Steve Jobs had started a new workstation venture called NeXT and as a result had developed a GUI operating system called NeXTSTEP. Apple ultimately purchased NeXT in 1996 and the OS then formed the foundation of future Apple operating systems. This deal is also notable as the point at which Steve Jobs returned to Apple and the company found significant new success under his leadership.

== Workstations ==
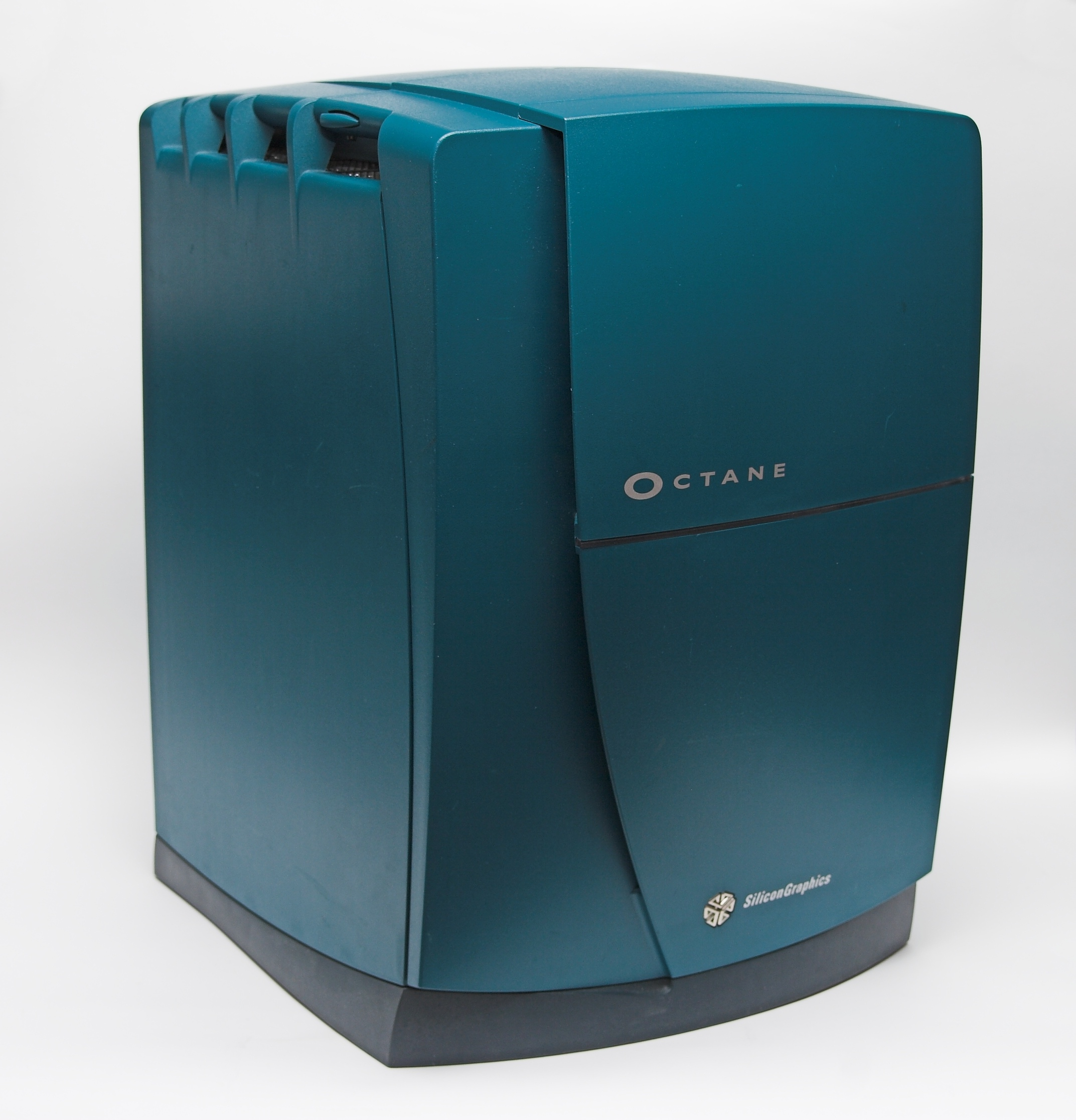
A Silicon Graphics Octane workstation

Workstations are a class of personal computer. The term workstation is a marketing moniker used to differentiate a personal computer from competing products. There is no strict technical definition as to what comprises a workstation other than it will usually be expected to have higher performance than an average business personal computer. Consequently, a workstation is usually more expensive and is marketed towards high-end professional use cases. Workstations are often aimed at very specific market niches such as scientific computing or graphics production that have requirements not fulfilled by mainstream business machines.

Prior to around the year 2000, it was common for workstations to be based around a unique bespoke architecture and the machines would be quite distinctive relative to PCs typically seen in business or the home. It was not uncommon for workstation vendors to produce their own CPUs with architectures such as MIPS, SPARC and Alpha appearing. Workstations often had custom-built graphics processors to achieve higher resolutions and colour depth than was typical on IBM PC machines of the era. Vendors would usually offer a proprietary operating system as standard, this was most often a variant of UNIX which afforded some degree of compatibility between competing workstation vendors but less so with software for DOS or Windows based IBM PCs. Vendors that were noted for the production of workstations included HP, DEC, Sun Microsystems, Silicon Graphics (SGI) and NeXT.

In subsequent years specialist workstation vendors declined as the performance of commodity PCs strengthened and became viable in the niches workstations would traditionally occupy. Personal computers described as workstations became more likely to be based around the standard PC architecture and use components not dissimilar to those found in mainstream business machines.

== IBM PC clones dominate ==
Towards the end of the 1980s, IBM PC XT clones started to encroach on the home computer market segment, previously the preserve of low cost manufacturers such as Atari, Inc. and Commodore. IBM PC compatible systems became cheaper and started to sell for under $1000, particularly via mail order rather than a traditional dealer network. These prices were achieved by using older generation PC technology. Dell began as one of these manufacturers, under its original name of PC's Limited.

== 1990s and 2000s ==
=== NeXT ===
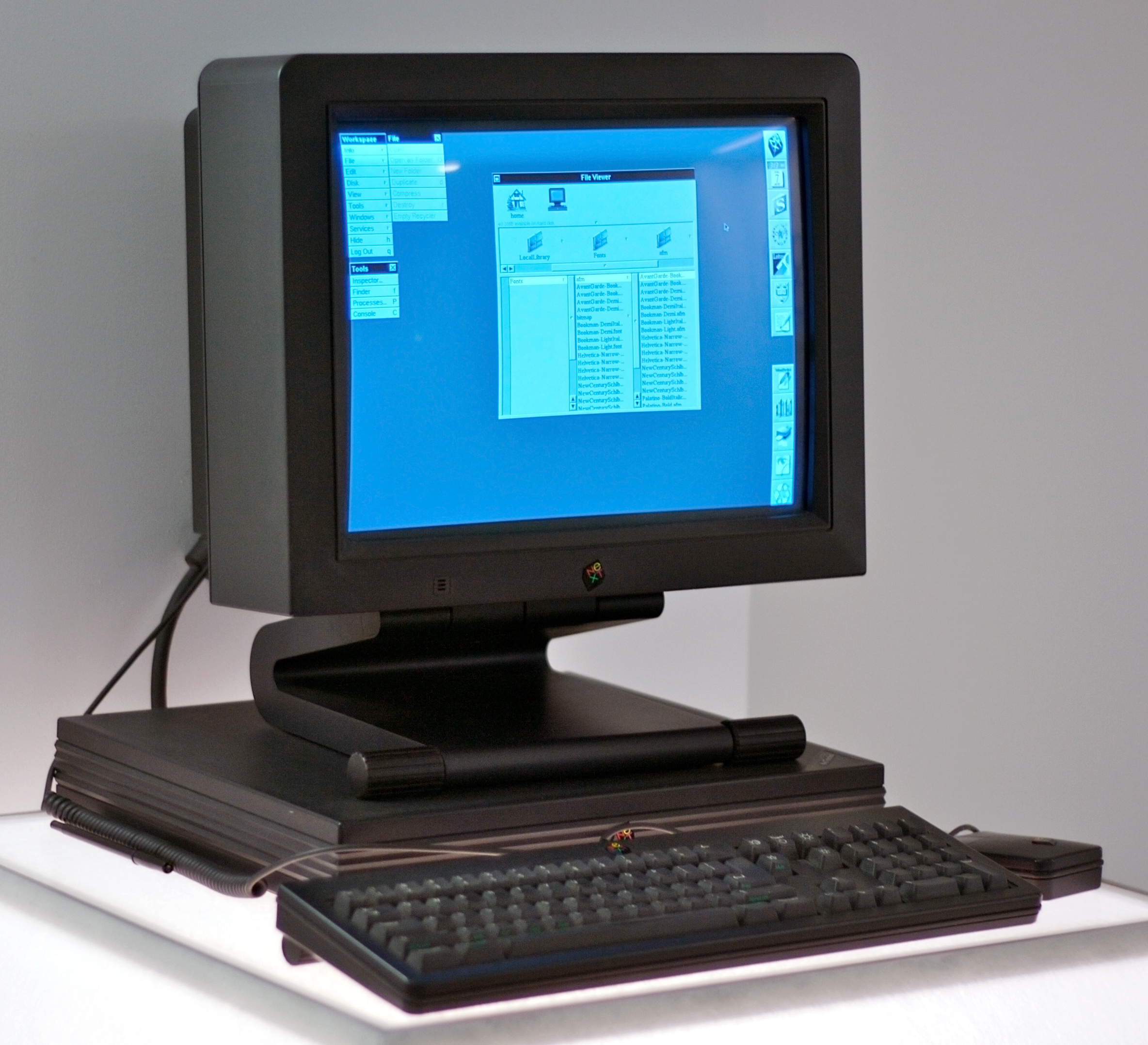
1990: NeXTstation

In 1990, the NeXTstation workstation went on sale, for "interpersonal" computing as Steve Jobs described it. The NeXTstation was meant to be a new computer for the 1990s, and cheaper than the previous NeXT Computer. Despite its pioneering use of object-oriented programming concepts, the NeXTstation was somewhat a commercial failure, and NeXT shut down hardware operations in 1993.

=== CD-ROM ===
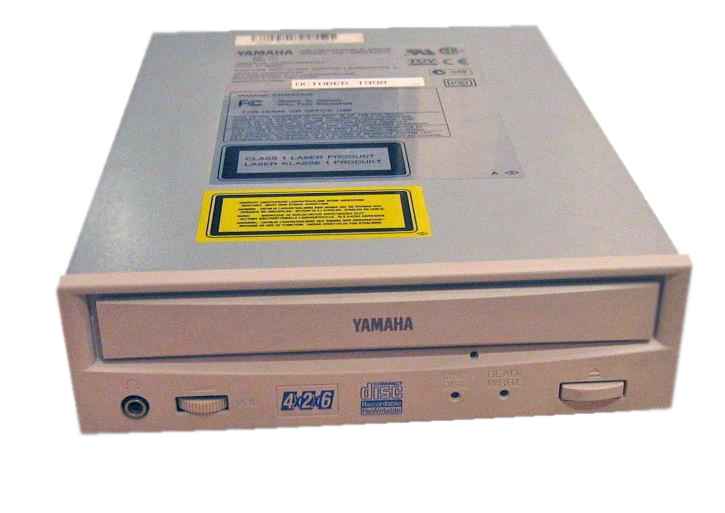
The CD-ROM and CD-RW drives became standards for most personal computers.

In the early 1990s, the CD-ROM became an industry standard, and by the mid-1990s one was built into almost all desktop computers, and toward the end of the 1990s, in laptops as well. Although introduced in 1982, the CD ROM was mostly used for audio during the 1980s, and then for computer data such as operating systems and applications into the 1990s. Another popular use of CD ROMs in the 1990s was multimedia, as many desktop computers started to come with built-in stereo speakers capable of playing CD quality music and sounds with the Sound Blaster sound card on PCs.

=== ThinkPad ===
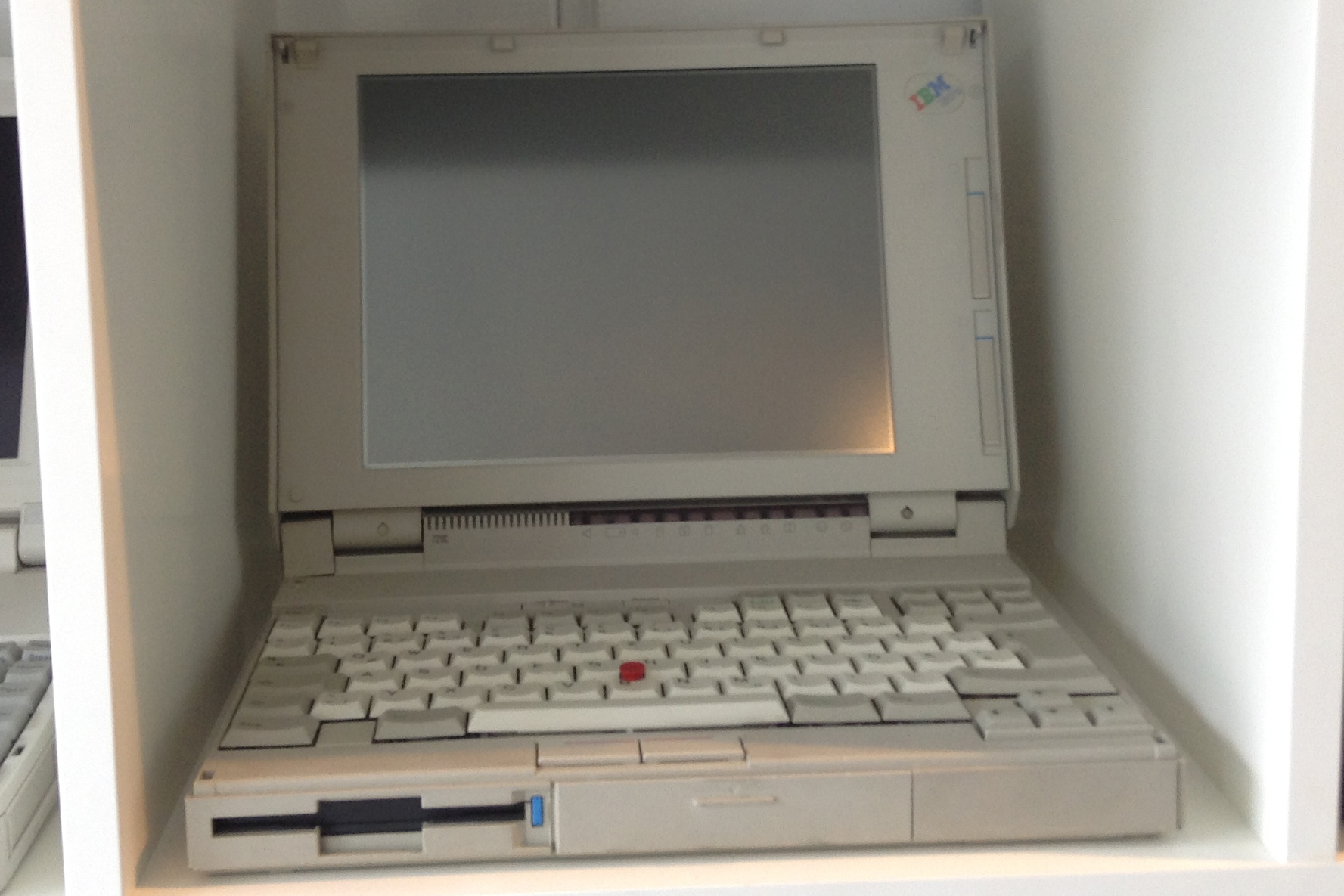
ThinkPad 720

IBM introduced its successful ThinkPad range at COMDEX 1992 using the series designators 300, 500 and 700 (allegedly analogous to the BMW car range and used to indicate market), the 300 series being the "budget", the 500 series "midrange" and the 700 series "high end". This designation continued until the late 1990s when IBM introduced the "T" series as 600/700 series replacements, and the 3, 5 and 7 series model designations were phased out for A (3&7) & X (5) series. The A series was later partially replaced by the R series.

=== Dell ===
By the mid-1990s, Amiga, Commodore and Atari systems were no longer on the market, pushed out by strong IBM PC clone competition and low prices. Other previous competition such as Sinclair and Amstrad were no longer in the computer market. With less competition than ever before, Dell rose to high profits and success, introducing low cost systems targeted at consumers and business markets using a direct-sales model. Dell surpassed Compaq as the world's largest computer manufacturer in 1999 and 2001, and held that position until October 2006.

=== Power Macintosh, PowerPC ===
In 1994, Apple introduced the Power Macintosh series of high-end professional desktop computers for desktop publishing and graphic designers. These new computers made use of new IBM PowerPC processors as part of the AIM alliance, to replace the previous Motorola 68k architecture used for the Macintosh line. During the 1990s, the Macintosh remained with a low market share, but as the primary choice for creative professionals, particularly those in the graphics and publishing industries.

=== Acorn Risc PC ===
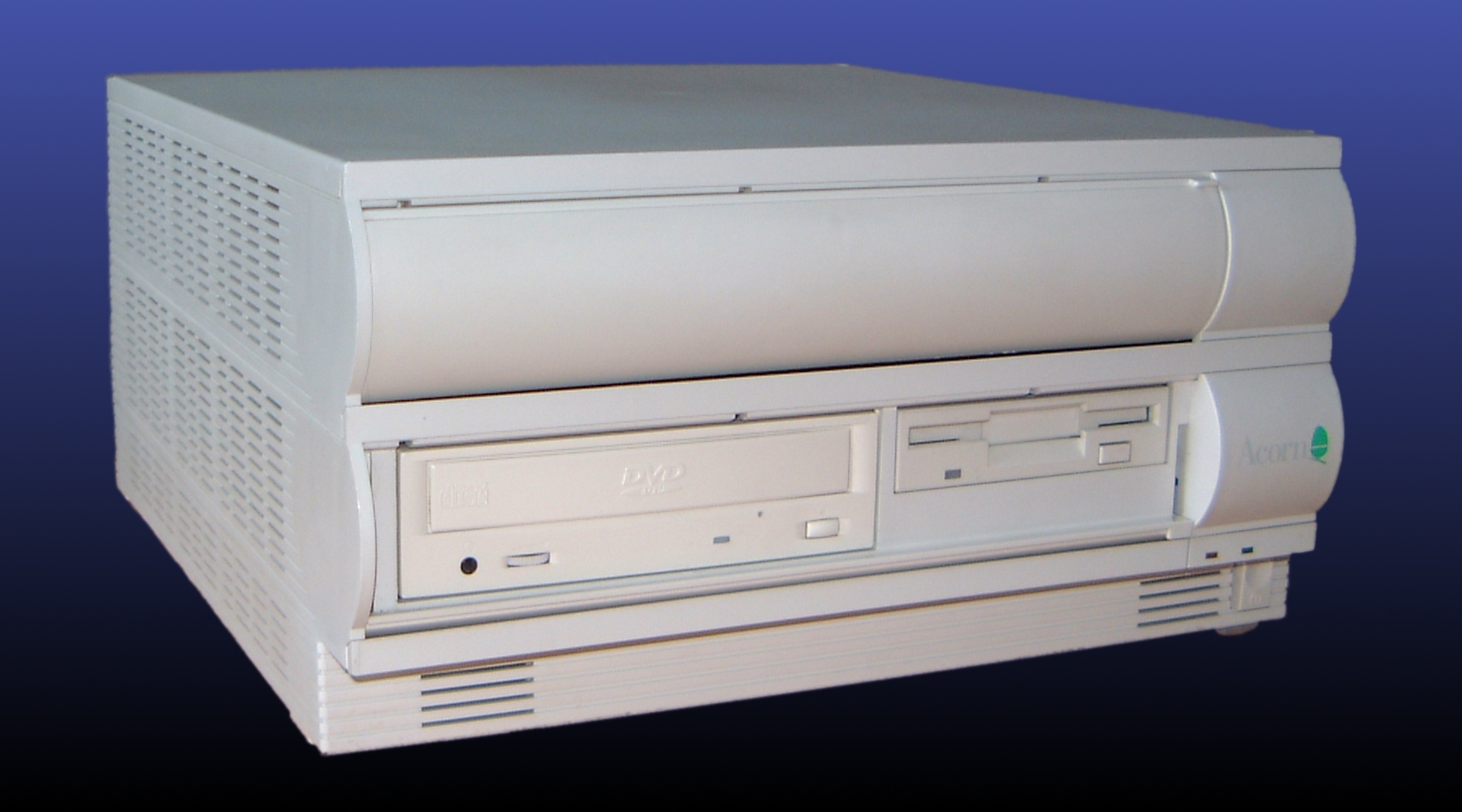
Acorn Risc PC 600 with two slices

In 1994, Acorn Computers launched its Risc PC range of desktop computers as the successor to the Archimedes. The machines were at the time an entirely unique architecture, based around the Acorn ARM CPU and used the proprietary Acorn RISC OS graphical operating system.

The Risc PC had a novel stacking design where multiple "slices", that is complete additional chassis with a full plastic case, could be mounted on top of each other to add additional features such as drives and expansion cards. The machines had a multi-processor architecture, with one CPU being provided as standard and at least one additional CPU could be added. The additional CPUs did not need to be ARM and entirely alien CPU architectures could run in parallel such as x86. With the addition of a second CPU, the Risc PC could run alternative operating systems (including Windows 95 and MS-DOS) concurrently with RISC OS in a window and could seamlessly merge applications from other operating systems into the RISC OS GUI environment as if they were native applications.

With Microsoft Windows on the rise and IBM clones becoming the mainstream business choice, a different architecture would always face market challenges against considerably larger rivals. The Risc PC did find some niches in applications such as television production and education however popular business applications were not natively available and developer interest in the platform waned. The capability of RISC OS to run entirely from ROM and the use of a low power CPU made it suited for embedded applications. RISC OS was used in a number of products independently of the Risc PC hardware, such as in the Oracle Network Computer thin client and a variety of set-top boxes under the name NCOS.

Acorn ceased Risc PC production in 1998 following a reorganisation of the company but Castle Technology independently continued production of Acorn designs under license until 2003. Castle Technology released their own Risc PC compatible design, the Iyonix PC, which was produced until 2008. RISC OS continued beyond the end of the Risc PC in a limited form and was used in a small number of other machines and embedded devices. RISC OS is still available after ultimately becoming an open source product in 2018 and there is a version that can run on the Raspberry Pi. The Acorn ARM CPU went on to substantial success in other markets with billions of chips manufactured.

=== IBM clones, Apple back into profitability ===
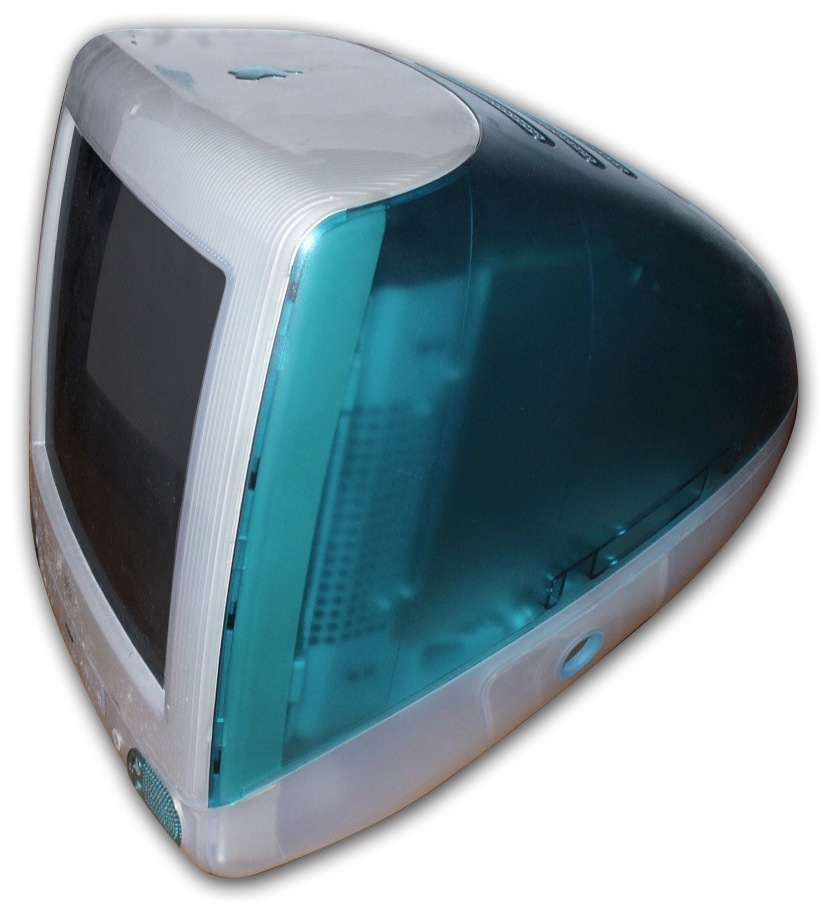
1998: iMac G3 in "Bondi Blue"

Due to the sales growth of IBM clones in the '90s, they became the industry standard for business and home use. This growth was augmented by the introduction of Microsoft's Windows 3.0 operating environment in 1990, and followed by Windows 3.1 in 1992 and the Windows 95 operating system in 1995. The Macintosh was sent into a period of decline by these developments coupled with Apple's own inability to come up with a successor to the Macintosh operating system, and by 1996 Apple was almost bankrupt. In December 1996 Apple bought NeXT and in what has been described as a "reverse takeover", Steve Jobs returned to Apple in 1997. The NeXT purchase and Jobs' return brought Apple back to profitability, first with the release of Mac OS 8, a major new version of the operating system for Macintosh computers, and then with the PowerMac G3 and iMac computers for the professional and home markets. The iMac was notable for its transparent bondi blue casing in an ergonomic shape, as well as its discarding of legacy devices such as a floppy drive and serial ports in favor of Ethernet and USB connectivity. The iMac sold several million units and a subsequent model using a different form factor remains in production as of August 2017. In 2001, Mac OS X, the long-awaited "next generation" Mac OS based on the NeXT technologies was finally introduced by Apple, cementing its comeback.

=== Writable CDs, MP3, P2P file sharing ===
The ROM in CD-ROM stands for Read Only Memory. In the late 1990s CD-R and later, rewritable CD-RW drives were included instead of standard CD ROM drives. This gave the personal computer user the capability to copy and "burn" standard Audio CDs which were playable in any CD player. As computer hardware grew more powerful and the MP3 format became pervasive, "ripping" CDs into small, compressed files on a computer's hard drive became popular. peer-to-peer networks such as Napster, Kazaa and Gnutella arose to be used almost exclusively for sharing music files and became a primary computer activity for many individuals.

=== USB, DVD player ===
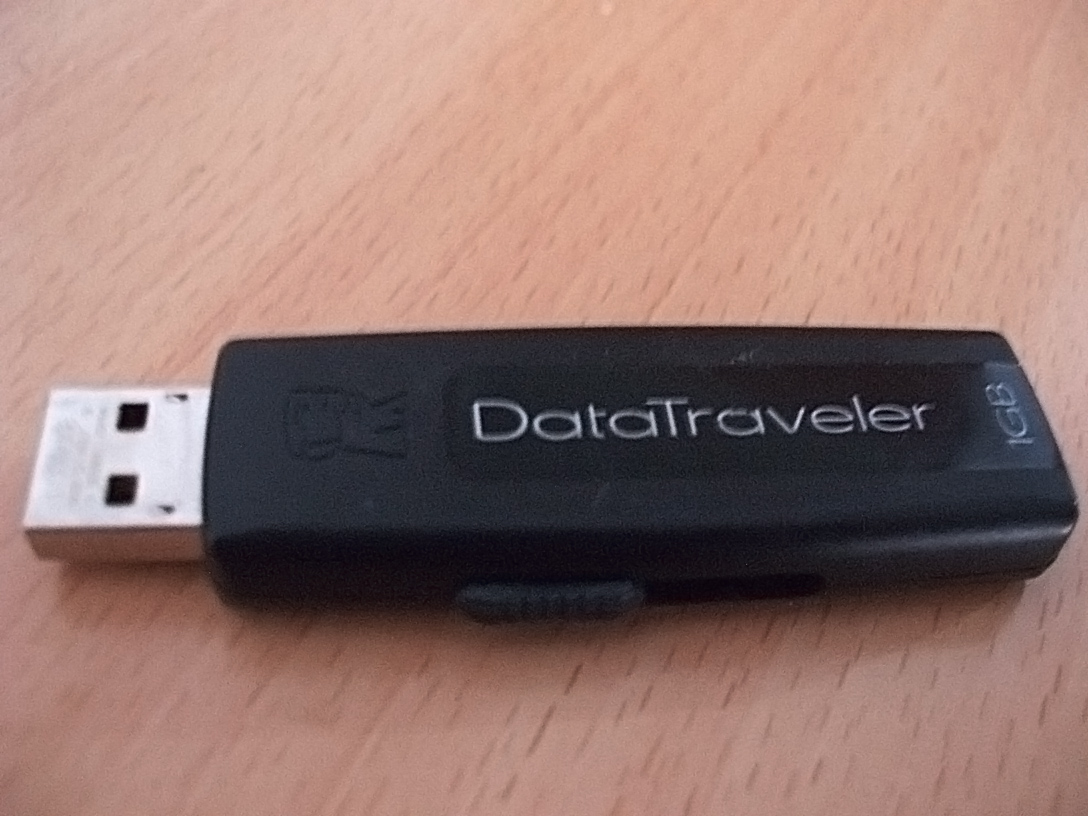
USB flash drive

Since the late 1990s, many more personal computers started shipping that included USB (Universal Serial Bus) ports for easy plug and play connectivity to devices such as digital cameras, video cameras, personal digital assistants, printers, scanners, USB flash drives and other peripheral devices. By the early 21st century, all shipping computers for the consumer market included at least two USB ports. Also during the late 1990s DVD players started appearing on high-end, usually more expensive, desktop and laptop computers, and eventually on consumer computers into the first decade of the 21st century.

=== Hewlett-Packard ===
In 2002, Hewlett-Packard (HP) purchased Compaq. Compaq itself had bought Tandem Computers in 1997 (which had been started by ex-HP employees), and Digital Equipment Corporation in 1998. Following this strategy HP became a major player in desktops, laptops, and servers for many different markets. The buyout made HP the world's largest manufacturer of personal computers, until Dell later surpassed HP.

=== 64 bits ===
In 2003, AMD shipped its 64-bit based microprocessor line for desktop computers, Opteron and Athlon 64. Also in 2003, IBM released the 64-bit based PowerPC 970 for Apple's high-end Power Mac G5 systems. Intel, in 2004, reacted to AMD's success with 64-bit based processors, releasing updated versions of their Xeon and Pentium 4 lines. 64-bit processors were first common in high end systems, servers and workstations, and then gradually replaced 32-bit processors in consumer desktop and laptop systems since about 2005.

=== Lenovo ===
In 2004, IBM announced the proposed sale of its PC business to Chinese computer maker Lenovo Group, which is partially owned by the Chinese government, for US$650 million in cash and $600 million US in Lenovo stock. The deal was approved by the Committee on Foreign Investment in the United States in March 2005, and completed in May 2005. IBM will have a 19% stake in Lenovo, which will move its headquarters to New York State and appoint an IBM executive as its chief executive officer. The company will retain the right to use certain IBM brand names for an initial period of five years. As a result of the purchase, Lenovo inherited a product line that featured the ThinkPad, a line of laptops that had been one of IBM's most successful products.

=== Wi-Fi, LCD monitor, flash memory ===
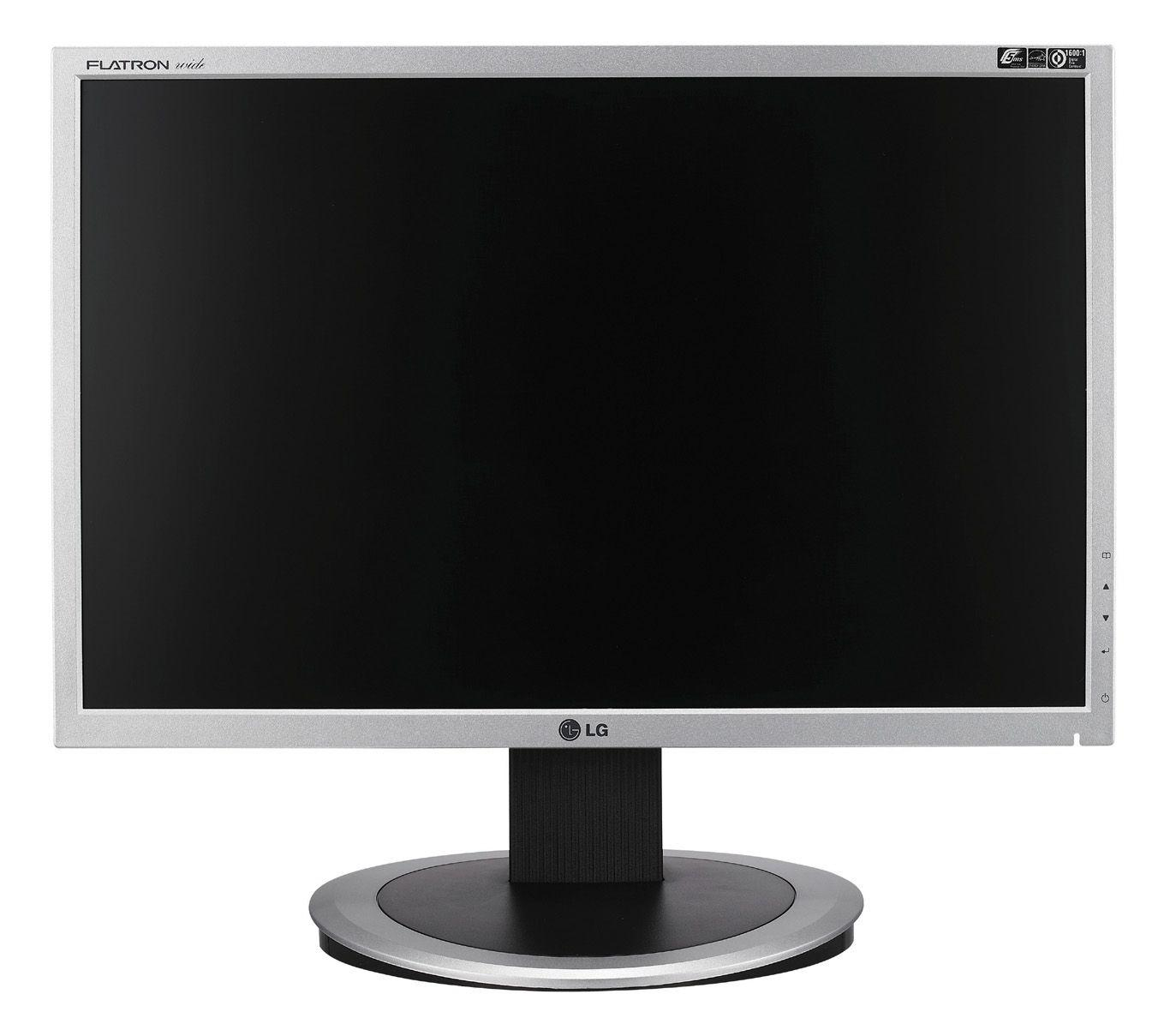
LCD monitor

In the early 21st century, Wi-Fi began to become increasingly popular as many consumers started installing their own wireless home networks. Many of today's laptops and desktop computers are sold pre-installed with wireless cards and antennas. Also in the early 21st century, LCD monitors became the most popular technology for computer monitors, with CRT production being slowed down. LCD monitors are typically sharper, brighter, and more economical than CRT monitors. The first decade of the 21st century also saw the rise of multi-core processors (see following section) and flash memory. Once limited to high-end industrial use due to expense, these technologies are now mainstream and available to consumers. In 2008, the MacBook Air and Asus Eee PC were released, laptops that dispense with an optical drive and hard drive entirely relying on flash memory for storage.

=== Local area networks ===
The invention in the late 1970s of local area networks (LANs), notably Ethernet, allowed PCs to communicate with each other (peer-to-peer) and with shared printers.

As the microcomputer revolution continued, more robust versions of the same technology were used to produce microprocessor based servers that could also be linked to the LAN. This was facilitated by the development of server operating systems to run on the Intel architecture, including several versions of both Unix and Microsoft Windows.

=== Multiprocessing ===
In May 2005, Intel and AMD released their first dual-core 64-bit processors, the Pentium D and the Athlon 64 X2 respectively. Multi-core processors can be programmed and reasoned about using symmetric multiprocessing (SMP) techniques known since the 60s (see the SMP article for details).

Apple switched to Intel in 2006, also thereby gaining multiprocessing.

In 2013, a Xeon Phi extension card is released with 57 x86 cores, at a price of $1695, equalling circa 30 dollars per core.

=== PCI-E ===
PCI Express is released in 2003. It becomes the most commonly used bus in PC-compatible desktop computers.

=== Cheap 3D graphics ===
Silicon Graphics (SGI) was a major 3D business that had grown annual revenues of $5.4 million to $3.7 billion from 1984 to 1997. The addition of 3D graphic capabilities to PCs, and the ability of clusters of Linux- and BSD-based PCs to take on many of the tasks of larger SGI servers, ate into SGI's core markets. The rise of cheap 3D accelerators displaced low-end products of Silicon Graphics, which went bankrupt in 2009.

Three former SGI employees had founded 3dfx in 1994. Their Voodoo Graphics extension card relied on PCI to provide cheap 3D graphics for PC's. Towards the end of 1996, the cost of EDO DRAM dropped significantly. A card consisted of a DAC, a frame buffer processor and a texture mapping unit, along with 4 MB of EDO DRAM. The RAM and graphics processors operated at 50 MHz. It provided only 3D acceleration and as such the computer also needed a traditional video controller for conventional 2D software.

NVIDIA bought 3dfx in 2000. In 2000, NVIDIA grew revenues 96%.

SGI had made OpenGL. Control of the specification was passed to the Khronos Group in 2006.

=== SDRAM ===
In 1993, Samsung introduced its KM48SL2000 synchronous DRAM, and by 2000, SDRAM had replaced virtually all other types of DRAM in modern computers, because of its greater performance. For more information see Synchronous dynamic random-access memory#SDRAM history.

Double data rate synchronous dynamic random-access memory (DDR SDRAM) is introduced in 2000.

Compared to its predecessor in PC-clones, single data Rate (SDR) SDRAM, the DDR SDRAM interface makes higher transfer rates possible by more strict control of the timing of the electrical data and clock signals.

=== ACPI ===
Released in December 1996, ACPI replaced Advanced Power Management (APM), the MultiProcessor Specification, and the Plug and Play BIOS (PnP) Specification.

Internally, ACPI advertises the available components and their functions to the operating system kernel using instruction lists ("methods") provided through the system firmware (Unified Extensible Firmware Interface (UEFI) or BIOS), which the kernel parses. ACPI then executes the desired operations (such as the initialization of hardware components) using an embedded minimal virtual machine.

First-generation ACPI hardware had issues. Windows 98 first edition disabled ACPI by default except on a whitelist of systems.

== 2010s ==
=== Semiconductor fabrication ===
In 2011, Intel announced the commercialisation of Tri-gate transistor. The Tri-Gate design is a variant of the FinFET 3D structure. FinFET was developed in the 1990s by Chenming Hu and his colleagues at UC Berkeley.

Through-silicon via is used in High Bandwidth Memory (HBM), a successor of DDR-SDRAM. HBM was released in 2013.

In 2016 and 2017, Intel, TSMC and Samsung begin releasing 10 nanometer chips. At the ≈10 nm scale, quantum tunneling (especially through gaps) becomes a significant phenomenon.

== 2020s ==
In May 2022, Chinese officials ordered government agencies and state-backed companies to remove personal computers produced by American corporations and replace them with equipment from domestic companies. The state-mandated order is expected to result in the removal of about 50 million computers, with HP and Dell expected to lose the most future business from the mandate.

== Market size ==
In 2001, 125 million personal computers were shipped in comparison to 48,000 in 1977. More than 500 million PCs were in use in 2002 and one billion personal computers had been sold worldwide since the mid-1970s till this time. Of the latter figure, 75 percent were professional or work related, while the rest sold for personal or home use. About 81.5 percent of PCs shipped had been desktop computers, 16.4 percent laptops and 2.1 percent servers. United States had received 38.8 percent (394 million) of the computers shipped, Europe 25 percent and 11.7 percent had gone to Asia-Pacific region, the fastest-growing market as of 2002. Almost half of all the households in Western Europe had a personal computer and a computer could be found in 40 percent of homes in United Kingdom, compared with only 13 percent in 1985. The third quarter of 2008 marked the first time laptops outsold desktop PCs in the United States.

As of June 2008, the number of personal computers worldwide in use hit one billion. Mature markets like the United States, Western Europe and Japan accounted for 58 percent of the worldwide installed PCs. About 180 million PCs (16 percent of the existing installed base) were expected to be replaced and 35 million to be dumped into landfill in 2008. The whole installed base grew 12 percent annually.

== See also ==
- History of laptops
- History of mobile phones
- History of software
- Timeline of electrical and electronic engineering
- Computer museum and Personal Computer Museum
- Expensive Desk Calculator
- MIT Computer Science and Artificial Intelligence Laboratory
- Educ-8 a 1974 pre-microprocessor "micro-computer"
- Mark-8, a 1974 microprocessor-based microcomputer
- SCELBI, another 1974 microcomputer
- Simon (computer), a 1949 demonstration of computing principles
- List of pioneers in computer science
