= David Bunnell =

American journalist

David Hugh Bunnell
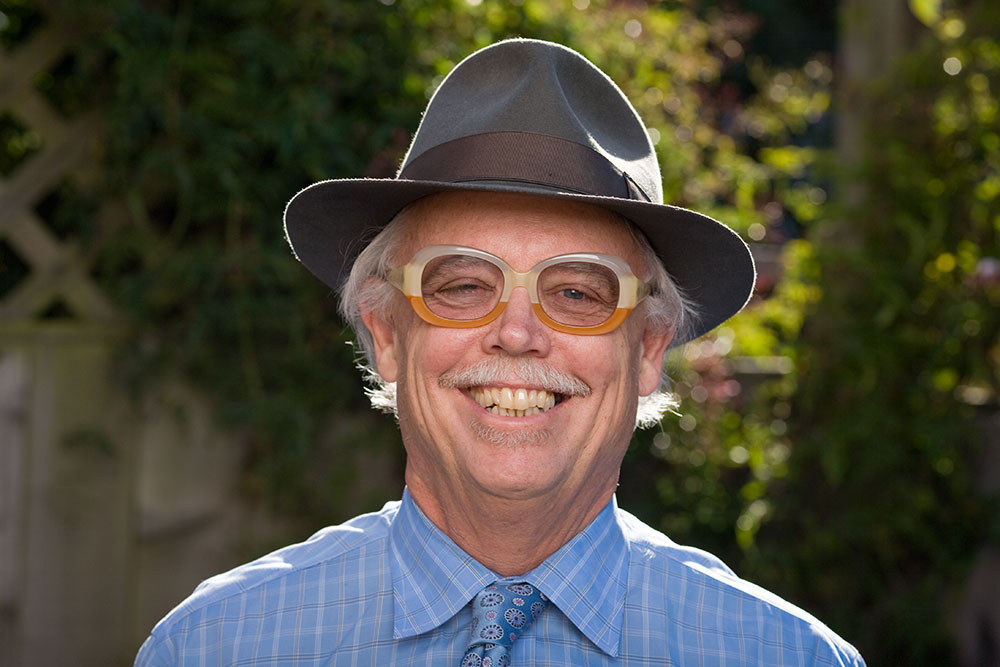
- Born: July 25, 1947; Alliance, Nebraska, U.S.
- Died: October 18, 2016 (aged 69); Berkeley, California, U.S.
- Education: University of Nebraska–Lincoln
- Occupation: Businessman
- Known for: Founder of PC Magazine, PC World, and Macworld

David Hugh Bunnell (July 25, 1947 – October 18, 2016) was a pioneer of the personal computing industry who founded some of the most successful computer magazines including PC Magazine, PC World, and Macworld. In 1975, he was working at MITS in Albuquerque, N.M., when the company made the first personal computer, the Altair 8800. His coworkers included Microsoft founders Bill Gates and Paul Allen, who created the first programming language for the Altair, Altair BASIC.

== Early life ==
David Bunnell grew up in the small town of Alliance, Nebraska, the son of Hugh Bunnell and Elois (Goodwin) Bunnell. He had one sibling, Roger Bunnell, three years his junior. In high school, he was on the state champion cross-country team. He worked with his father, the editor of the Alliance Daily Times-Herald newspaper. During his senior year in high school, Bunnell served as the sports editor of the newspaper.

Bunnell attended the University of Nebraska–Lincoln from 1965 to 1969, where he graduated with a B.A. majoring in history. While at the university, he was active in the anti-Vietnam war movement and was elected president of the Students for a Democratic Society (SDS).

== Family ==
He married Linda Essay, also of Alliance, in 1969. They had two children, Mara Rebecca (1971) and Aaron John Hassan (1974 - 2000). The couple was divorced in 1978, but remained friends. In 1981, he married photographer, Jaqueline Dowds Poitier. They raised her daughter, Jennifer Poitier and subsequently her two daughters, Jamaica Poitier and Xaire Poitier in Berkeley, California. Jaqueline (Jackie) was a driving force behind his career in the publishing industry; the couple pioneered PC Magazine (with Jim Edlin and Cheryl Woodard) in the bedroom of their rental house in San Francisco's Sunset Neighborhood.

== Career ==
Bunnell worked as a public school teacher in Southside Chicago from 1969 to 1971, with wife, Linda, who was also a teacher. They transferred to the Pine Ridge Indian Reservation in South Dakota as teachers. He delivered food to the Native Americans who occupied Wounded Knee for 71 days beginning on February 27, 1973. The couple moved to Albuquerque, NM with their baby, Mara in 1973.

In 1991, Bunnell founded BioWorld, the online business newspaper and print magazine for the Biotechnology Industry, which he sold to Thompson Media Group in 1994. From 1996 to 2002, he was CEO and Editor-in-Chief of Upside (magazine) which became very successful during the dot-com bubble.

In 2007, Bunnell co-founded ELDR magazine with Chad Lewis. The magazine, which covers the boomer market, was named Best New Consumer Magazine by Folio Magazine in 2008. He died on October 18, 2016, at the age of 69 in Berkeley, California.

== Publications ==
=== Publications by Bunnell ===
- Personal Computing: A Beginner's Guide. Hawthorne, 1978.
- Making the Cisco Connection. Wiley, 2000.
- Good Friday on The Rez. New York: St. Martin's Press, 2017. ISBN 978-1250112538.

=== Publications with others ===
- An Introduction to Microcomputers. With Adam Osborne. McGraw-Hill, 1982.
- The eBay Phenomenon. With Richard Luecke. Wiley, 2007.
- Count Down Your Age: Look, Feel, and Live Better Than You Ever Have Before. With Frederic Vagnini. McGraw-Hill, 2007.
