= Traf-O-Data =

Early predecessor company to Microsoft

- Type: Private
- Industry: Transportation engineering
- Founded: June 13, 1972; 54 years ago in Seattle, Washington, U.S.
- Founders: Bill Gates; Paul Allen; Paul Gilbert
- Defunct: 1975; 51 years ago
- Successor: Microsoft
- Headquarters: Seattle, Washington, U.S.

Traf-O-Data was a business partnership between Bill Gates, Paul Allen and Paul Gilbert that existed in the 1970s. The objective was to read the raw data from roadway traffic counters and create reports for traffic engineers. The company had only modest success but the experience was instrumental in the creation of Microsoft Corporation a few years later.

== History ==
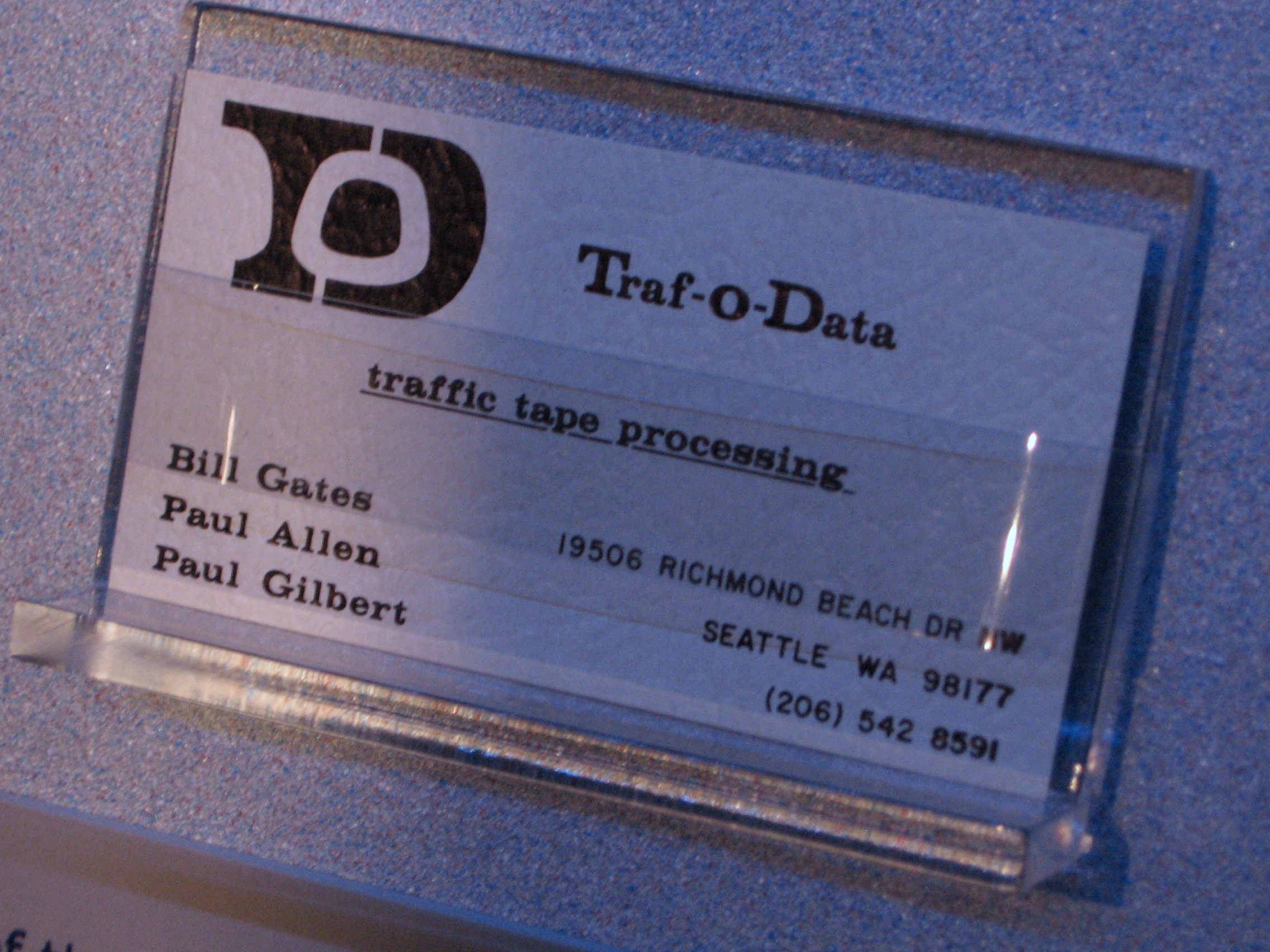
Business card showing the names of Gates, Allen, and Gilbert from the New Mexico Museum of Natural History and Science

In the 1970s, traffic counts were mechanically recorded on a roll of paper tape. The time and number of axles were punched as a 16 bit pattern onto the paper.

Bill Gates and Paul Allen were high school students at Lakeside School in Seattle. The Lakeside Programmers Group got free time on various computers in exchange for writing computer programs. Gates and Allen thought they could process the traffic data cheaper and faster than the local companies by building a computer that could process all the traffic tapes using the Intel 8008 processor. The goal was to sell such machines to states and local governments as a time and cost-saving tool.

Since Gates and Allen did not know how to build a computer capable of processing data on paper tapes, they recruited Paul Gilbert to help build a prototype that can manually read the hole-patterns in the paper tape and transcribe the data onto computer cards. Gilbert became the third partner. Gates then used a computer at the University of Washington to produce the traffic flow chart. This was the beginning of Traf-O-Data.

== Hardware ==
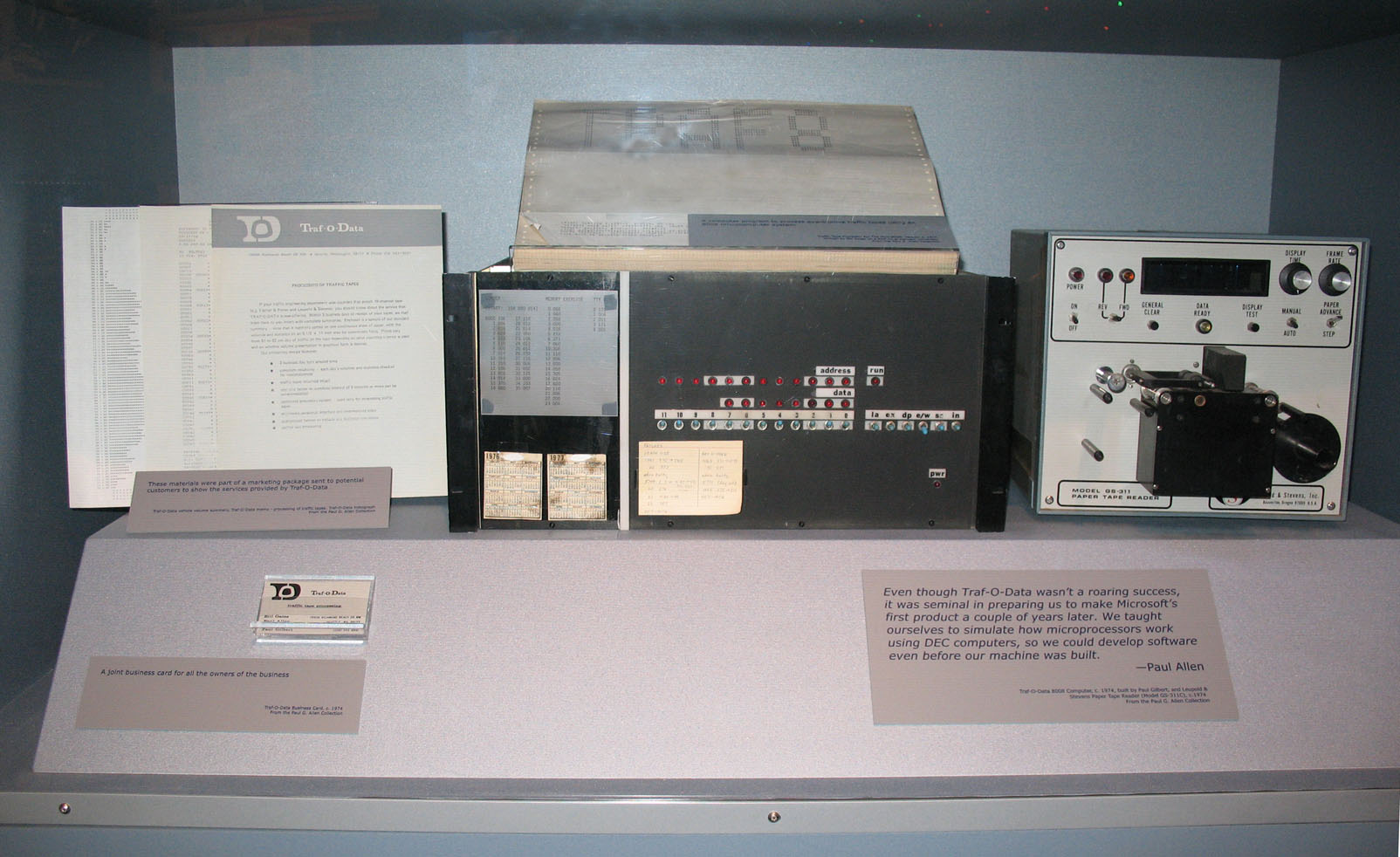
Traf-O-Data 8008 computer with a tape reader

The next step was to build a device to read the traffic tapes directly and eliminate the tedious manual work. The Intel 8008 microprocessor was announced in 1972 and they realized it could read the tapes and process the data. Allen had graduated and was enrolled at Washington State University. Since neither Gates nor Allen had any hardware design experience, they were initially stumped.

Gates and Allen had a friend, Paul Wennberg, who, like them, loitered at Control Data Corporation near the University of Washington, cadging open time on the mainframe computer. Wennberg, later the founder of the Triakis Corporation, was an electrical engineering student at the University of Washington. Over the course of events Gates and Allen mentioned they were looking for somebody to build them a computer for free. They needed somebody good enough to build a computer from parts and the diagrams found in a computer magazine. Wennberg talked to his friend, Wes Prichard, who suggested to Wennberg that Gates and Allen head over to the UW Physics building, now known as Mary Gates Hall, to talk to Paul Gilbert, another electrical engineering student, who worked in the high-energy tracking laboratory. It was there that Paul Gilbert was approached by the duo to become a partner in Traf-O-Data.

In that year, Gilbert built the working microcomputer. Miles Gilbert, Paul Gilbert's brother, a graphic designer and draftsman, helped the fledgling company by designing the company's logo. Gates and Allen started writing the software. To test the software while the computer was being designed, Paul Allen wrote a computer program on WSU's PDP-10 that would emulate the 8008 microprocessor.

Although the plan had been to manufacture and sell the machines:

"... when the guy from the County that Seattle's in came to see it, it didn't work. We ended up being okay successful, not seriously successful ... just by processing the tapes. At first, that was a very manual process. Then we used this prototype machine that we built to do that. So, we made a little bit of money and had some fun with it."

— Bill Gates, Smithsonian

Later, the State of Washington offered free traffic processing services to cities, ending the need for private contractors, and all three principals moved on to other projects. The real contribution of Traf-O-Data was the experience that Gates and Allen gained, skills they used to write Altair BASIC for the MITS Altair 8800 computer:

"Even though Traf-O-Data wasn't a roaring success, it was seminal in preparing us to make Microsoft's first product a couple of years later. We taught ourselves to simulate how microprocessors work, using DEC computers, so we could develop software even before our machine was built."

— Paul Allen, Fortune
