= Pertec =

American computer company

Pertec Computer Corporation
- Industry: Computer Peripherals
- Predecessor: Peripheral Equipment Corporation
- Founded: 1967; 59 years ago
- Defunct: 1987
- Fate: Acquired by Triumph-Adler
- Headquarters: Chatsworth, California, United States

Pertec Computer Corporation (PCC), formerly Peripheral Equipment Corporation (PEC), was a computer company based in Chatsworth, California which originally designed and manufactured peripherals such as floppy drives, tape drives, instrumentation control and other hardware for computers.

Pertec's most successful products were hard disk drives and tape drives, which were sold as OEM to the top computer manufacturers, including IBM, Siemens and DEC. Pertec manufactured multiple models of seven and nine-track half-inch tape drives with densities 800CPI (NRZI) and 1600CPI (PE) and phase-encoding formatters, which were used by myriad original equipment manufacturers as I/O devices for their product lines.

In the 1970s, Pertec entered the computer industry through several acquisitions of computer producers and started manufacturing and marketing mostly minicomputers for data processing and pre-processing. This split up Pertec into two companies. Pertec Peripherals Corporation (PPC), which remained based in Chatsworth, California, and Pertec Computer Corporation (PCC), which was located at 17112 Armstrong Avenue, in Irvine, California.

== Pertec and MITS ==
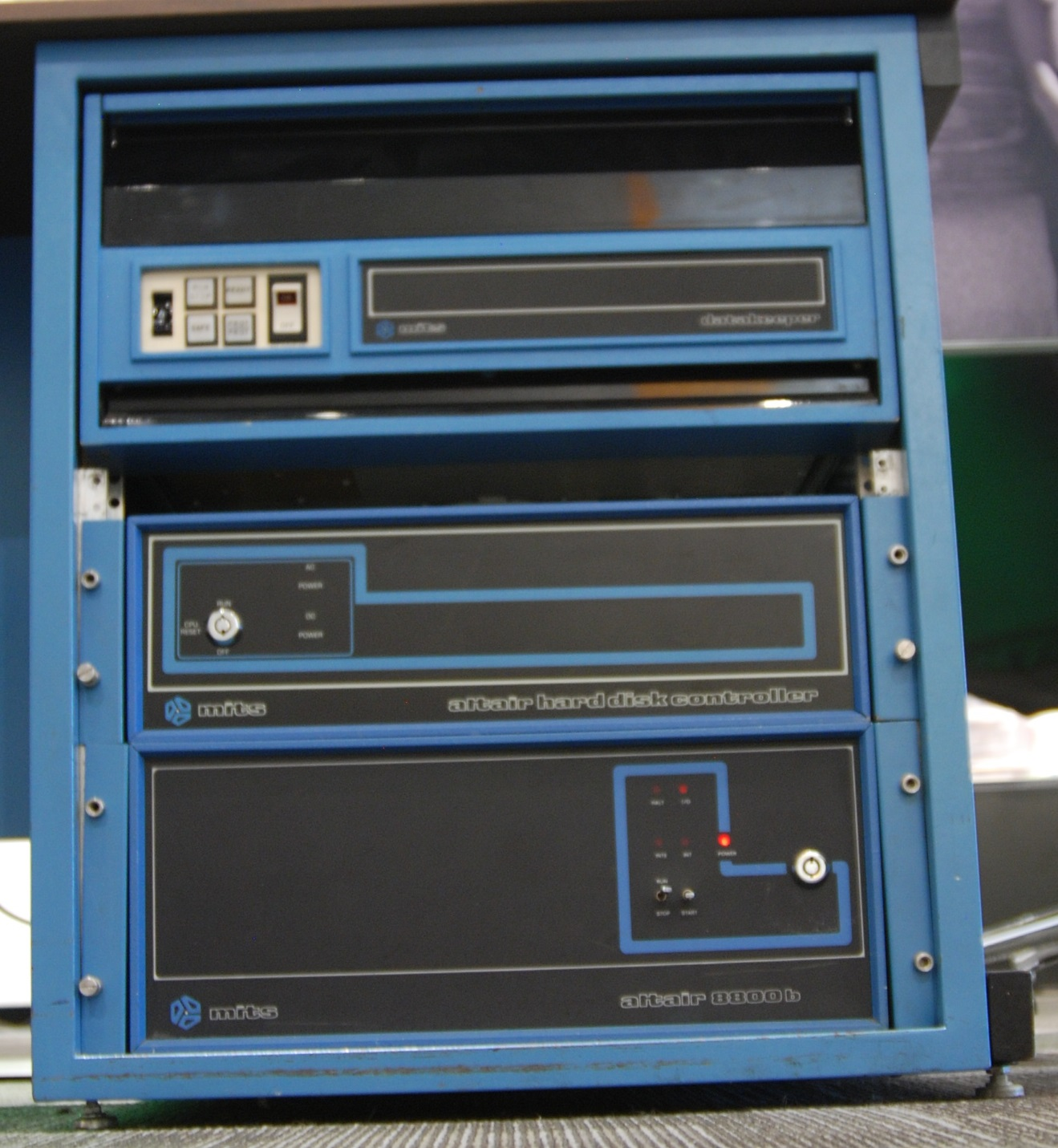
Altair 8800B, on display at the Living Computer Museum in Seattle, Washington

Pertec bought MITS, the manufacturers of the MITS Altair computer, for US$6.5 million in 1976. This purchase was motivated mainly by the ownership of the Microsoft BASIC sources and general license that Pertec erroneously assumed to be included in the deal. They also acquired iCOM Microperipherals, makers of computer peripherals, in the same year. They believed that these acquisitions would change them from selling computers mostly for hobbyists, to selling them for small businesses.

Pertec changed their name, after the acquisition of MITS, from Pertec Corporation to Pertec Computer Corporation to "be more reflective of the company's present position and to clearly state our future direction".

As a result of the acquisition, Pertec became involved in the manufacturing of microprocessor-based computers. Their first models were expanded versions of the Altair models, typically coupled to the existing disk-drive range. Despite initially good sales, the Altair's 8080 CPU was becoming increasingly outdated, so Pertec decided to retire the Altair as well as the MITS name itself.

In 1978, the company launched the first of its own designs, the PCC-2000. This was based on two Intel 8085 series microprocessors: one of which was given over to I/O control. Being a high end machine, it was intended to be the core of what would now be described as a workgroup. The machine was intended to support four "dumb" terminals connected via RS-232 serial lines, in addition to its internal console. The basic machine had twin 8-inch floppy drives, each capable of storing 1.2 megabytes and could link to two Pertec twin 14-inch disk drives, giving a total of 22.4 megabytes of storage, which was a very large amount for the time. The system was generally supplied with a multi-user operating system called MTX, which included a BASIC interpreter that was similar to Business Basic. The PCC-2000 was also available with MITS DOS or CP/M. In the UK, several systems were run under BOS. Unfortunately, the PCC-2000 was too expensive for the market and was never a great success.

== Pertec Business Systems ==
=== Pertec/MITS 300 ===
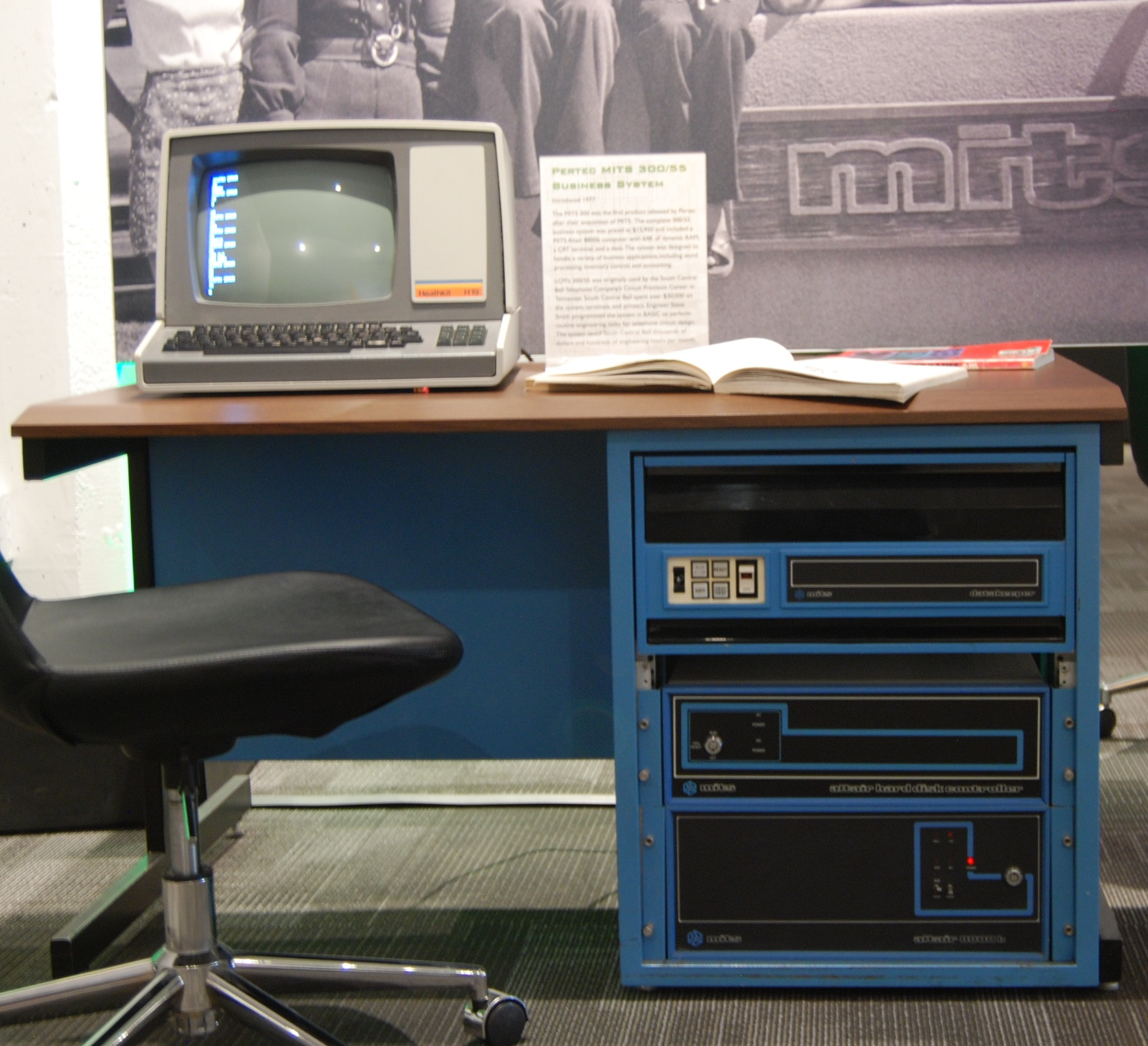
Pertec/MITS 300/55 Business System. Currently on display at the Living Computer Museum in Seattle, Washington.

The MITS 300 was the first product built and released by the Pertec after their acquisition of MITS in 1977. They produced the 300/25 and the 300/55. Both were fully integrated systems that included both hardware and software in one package. The 300/25 used Pertec floppy diskette drives and the 300/55 added Pertec DC-3000 14-inch hard disk. The system consists of the MITS 2nd generation Altair 8800 (or Altair 8800b) computer with hard drive controller and MITS datakeeper storage system. The complete 300/55 business system sold for $15,950 and included the Altair 8800b with 64k of dynamic RAM, a CRT terminal and a desk. The system was designed to handle a variety of business applications including word processing, inventory control and accounting. This system was prone to overheating and had a very short life span.

The new system allowed for MITS peripherals including Altair Floppy Disc, Altair Line Printer, Teletypewriter, and the Altair CRT terminal. The printer was a bidirectional Mits/Altair C-700 that could print 60 characters/second and 26 lines/minute.

=== Pertec PCC-2100 ===
Pertec's primary line of computer products was aimed at the key-to-disk minicomputer systems that were used as front-end data processors for the IBM 360/370 and similar systems. This line was opened in the first half of the 1970s by the Pertec PCC-2100 data entry system, which was essentially different from the PCC-2000 mentioned above. The system was able to serve up to 16 coaxial terminals, two D3000 disk drives and one T1640 tape drive.

=== Pertec XL-40 ===
Pertec XL-40, introduced in 1977, was a more successful successor of Pertec PCC-2100. The XL-40 machine used custom 16-bit processors built from the TI3000 or AMD2900 slices, up to 512 KB operating memory and dedicated master-capable DMA controllers for tape units, floppy and rigid disk units, printers, card reader and terminals.

The maximum configuration came in two different versions. One featured four T1600 / T1800 tape units (manufactured by Pertec), two floppy disk units (manufactured by IBM or Pertec) and four D1400 / D3400 rigid disk units (4.4, 8.8, 17.6 MB formatted capacity, manufactured by Pertec or Kennedy). The other one featured two large capacity disk units (up to 70 MB formatted capacity, manufactured by Kennedy or NEC), one line printer connected through long-line interface (DataProducts LP600, LP1200, B300, Printronix P300, P600), four station printers connected through coaxial cable (Centronics), one card reader (Pertec), four SDLC communication channels and 30 proprietary coax terminals (Model 4141 with 40x12 characters or Model 4143 with 80x25 characters).

The system was mainly used for key-to-disk operations to replace the previously popular IBM card punches and more advanced key-to-tape systems manufactured for example by Mohawk Data Sciences (MDS) or Singer. In addition to the basic key-to-disk function, the proprietary operating system, called XLOS, supported indexed file operations for on-line transaction processing even with data journaling. The system was programmed in two different ways. The data entry was either described in several tables that specified the format of the input record with optional automatic data validation procedures or the indexed file operations were programmed in a special COBOL dialect with IDX and SEQ file support.

System maintenance operations were performed in a protected supervisor mode; the system supported batched operations in the supervisor mode through the use of batch files that specified operator selections. The operating system interacted with the user through a series of prompts with automatic on-screen explanations and default selections, probably the ultimate user-friendliness achievable in text-only human-computer interaction. The XL-40 was also marketed by Triumph-Adler in Europe as TA1540, the beginning of a relationship that would eventually see a merger of the two companies.

=== Pertec 3200 ===
Pertec's final in-house computer design was a complete departure, the MC68000-based Series 3200. The primary operating system was an in-house developed multi-tasking, multi-user operating system, but it could also run Unix. As with the XL40, Triumph-Adler marketed the system in Europe under their own brand with the model name MSX 3200 (There were four models, eventually, in the Triumph-Adler series: 3200, 3220, 3230 and 3240). The key to disk application from the XL40 was re-implemented on the 3200. The other main application was a BASIC language driven database, similar to the ones used by MAI Basic Four or Pick operating system. These BASIC database business systems would be purchased by outside companies that bundled the PCC 3200 with their software to provide a complete small business package (accounts payable, accounts receivable, payroll, inventory, sales tracking, taxes, etc.) customized for specific businesses.

The 3200 was extremely advanced for the time, being intended to support up to 32 users, all using intelligent Z80-based terminals, each of which could optionally run CP/M attached to the 3200's high speed coax cable. Later an ISA bus to 3200 coax interface was made for the PC, and this allowed the usage of PC's as smart terminals for the 3200 or as networked systems running MS-DOS. It was the first Pertec product to support the emerging "Winchester" standard for miniature hard disks.

== Eventual fate ==
Soon after the introduction of the 3200, Pertec Computer Corporation was purchased by Triumph-Adler, from 2010 owned by Kyocera. Later, PCC was acquired by Scan-Optics in February 1987. During the transition from systems based on custom-made CPUs to CPUs made by Intel and Motorola, prices for these systems dropped dramatically, but without an offsetting increase in demand, and eventually companies such as PCC slowly dwindled away to small remnants of their peak days in the mid-1980s, or were bought out by larger companies.

Pertec's PPC magnetic tape interface standard of the early 1970s rapidly became an industry-wide standard and is still in use by tape drive manufacturers today. Similarly, its PERTEC disk interface was an industry standard for pre-Winchester disk drives of the 1970s.
