= Micro Instrumentation and Telemetry Systems =

American electronics company

Micro Instrumentation and Telemetry Systems, Inc.
- Type: Private
- Industry: Computer hardware
- Founded: 1969 in Albuquerque, New Mexico, United States
- Founder: Ed Roberts, Forrest Mims
- Fate: Acquired by Pertec in 1977
- Headquarters: Albuquerque, New Mexico, United States
- Products: Altair 8800
- Number of employees: 230 (1976)

Micro Instrumentation and Telemetry Systems, Inc. (MITS), was an American electronics company founded in Albuquerque, New Mexico that began manufacturing electronic calculators in 1971 and personal computers in 1975.

Ed Roberts and Forrest Mims founded MITS in December 1969 to produce miniaturized telemetry modules for model rockets such as a roll rate sensor. In 1971, Roberts redirected the company into the electronic calculator market and the MITS 816 desktop calculator kit was featured on the November 1971 cover of Popular Electronics. The calculators were very successful and sales topped one million dollars in 1973. A brutal calculator price war left the company deeply in debt by 1974.

Roberts then developed the first commercially successful microcomputer, the Altair 8800, which was featured on the January 1975 cover of Popular Electronics. Hobbyists flooded MITS with orders for the $397 computer kit. Paul Allen and Bill Gates saw the magazine and began writing software for the Altair, later called Altair BASIC. They moved to Albuquerque to work for MITS and in July 1975 started Microsoft.

MITS's annual sales had reached $6 million by 1977 when they were acquired by Pertec Computer. The operations were soon merged into the larger company and the MITS brand disappeared. Roberts retired to Georgia where he studied medicine and became a small town medical doctor.

== Origin ==
=== Founders ===
Henry Edward Roberts studied Electrical Engineering at the University of Miami before enlisting in the U.S. Air Force in 1962. He soon became an electronics instructor at the Cryptographic Equipment Maintenance School at Lackland Air Force Base in San Antonio, Texas. To augment his meager enlisted man's pay, Roberts worked on several off-duty projects and even set up a one-man company, Reliance Engineering. The most notable job was to create the electronics that animated the Christmas characters in the window display of Joske's department store in San Antonio. In 1965, he was selected for an Air Force program to complete his college degree, and became a commissioned officer. Roberts earned an Electrical Engineering degree from Oklahoma State University in 1968 and was assigned to the Weapons Laboratory at Kirtland AFB in Albuquerque, New Mexico.

Forrest Mims was interested in science and electronics as a youth and even built an analog computer while in high school. Mims graduated from Texas A&M University in 1966 (major in government with minors in English and history) then became a commissioned officer in the U.S. Air Force. While serving in Vietnam as an intelligence officer, Mims continued his model rocket hobby. At Texas A&M, Mims developed an infrared obstacle-sensing device and he experimented with it at the Saigon School for Blind Boys and Girls. Launching model rockets in an area accustomed to rocket attacks and working with blind children resulted in a story in the military newspaper, Stars and Stripes. This caught the attention of an Air Force Colonel, who arranged for Mims to be assigned to the Weapons Laboratory at Kirtland AFB even though Mims lacked an engineering degree.

Roberts and Mims were both assigned to the Lab's Laser Group in 1968. Roberts had reactivated Reliance Engineering and built an infrared intrusion alarm for his uncle's fish farm in Florida. Later, Roberts and Stan Cagle, a civilian worker who also went to Oklahoma State, started building a power supply they hoped to sell. Mims became an advisor to the Albuquerque Model Rocket Club and met George J. Flynn, the publisher of Model Rocketry magazine, in July 1969. Mims told him about a transistorized tracking light that he had used on night launches of rockets in Vietnam. This led to an article in the September 1969 issue of Model Rocketry; "Transistorized Tracking Light for Night Launched Model Rockets" by Captain Forrest Mims. Mims became a regular contributor to Model Rocketry.

=== Model rocket kits ===
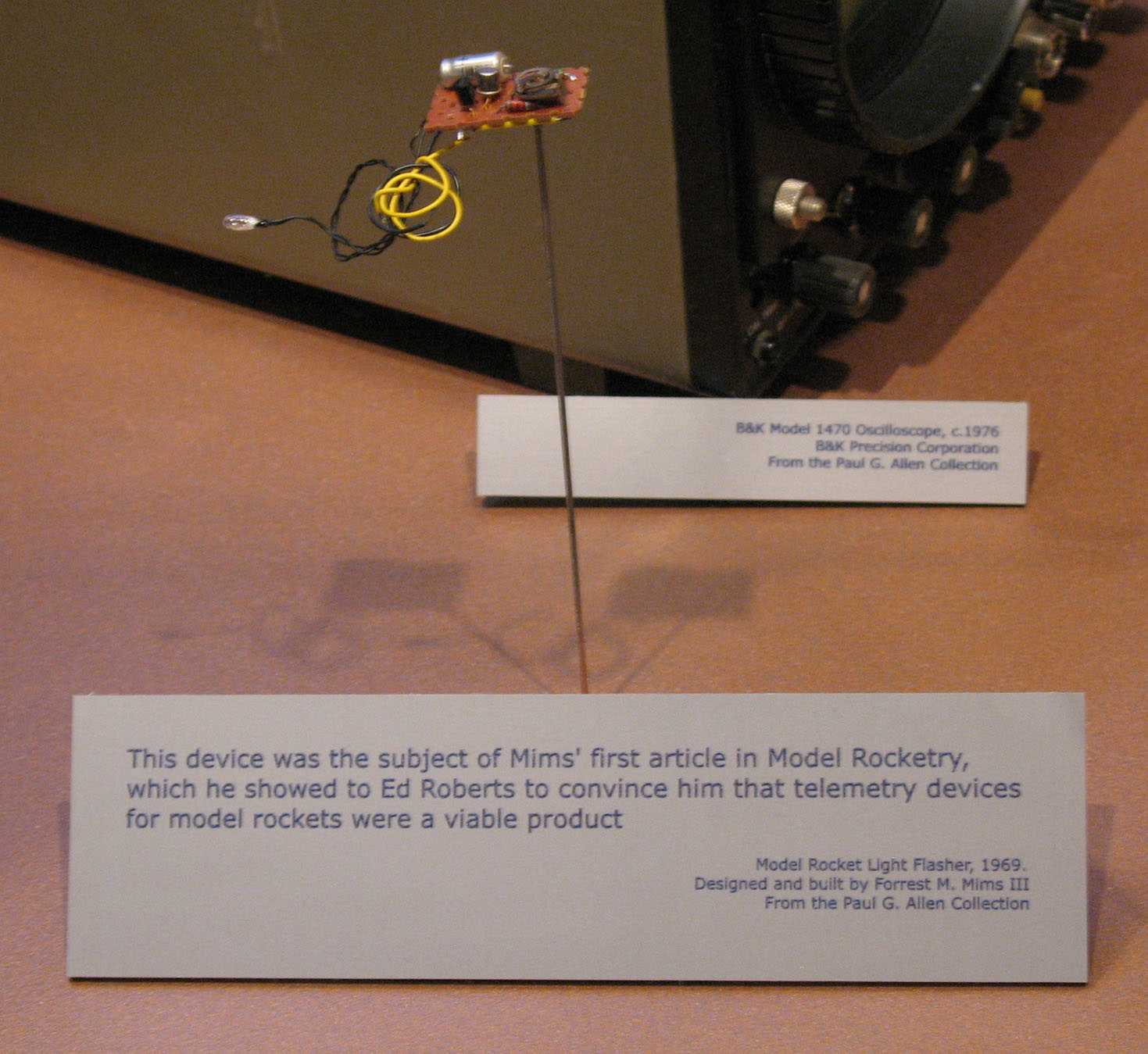
Transistorized tracking light for model rockets. The product that launched MITS

Crewed space flight and the race to the moon in the 1960s made model rocketry a popular hobby. Roberts, Mims, Cagle and another Air Force officer from the Lab, Bob Zaller, decided they could design and sell electronics kits to model rocket hobbyists. Roberts wanted to call the new company Reliance Engineering, Mims wanted to form an acronym similar to the Massachusetts Institute of Technology's MIT. Cagle came up with Micro Instrumentation and Telemetry Systems, MITS. The December 1969 issue of Model Rocketry (circulation 15,000) carried a press release that began:

Reliance Engineering in Albuquerque, New Mexico has announced the formation of a subsidiary company for the manufacture of miniaturized electronic and telemetry systems designed for model rockets. The company is called Micro Instrumentation and Telemetry Systems (MITS). Reliance Engineering president Henry Roberts announced that "MITS is presently conducting an intensive research program involving high quality miniature telemetry systems."

The first commercially available model rocket telemetry transmitter is among the first items to be offered by MITS. Accessory modules including a tone beacon, temperature sensor, and a roll rate sensor, as well as tracking lights, ground systems for data reduction, and light weight, water activated batteries will soon be available.

They designed and built the telemetry modules in their homes and garages but they were only able to sell a few hundred units. Mims had sold a feature article about the new solid-state device, light-emitting diodes, to Popular Electronics (circulation 400,000) that May. With the hope of selling kits to the larger readership; Roberts and Mims designed a device that would transmit voice over a beam of light, the Opticom. The editors accepted the project story and both articles were featured on the cover of the November 1970 issue. The payment for the articles was $400 but meeting Les Solomon, Popular Electronics technical editor, proved to be significant to both Mims and Roberts future success.

In August 1970, Les Solomon, his wife and daughter were on vacation in the southwest and arranged to visit Mims, Roberts and their families. At that time, Dan Meyer and Don Lancaster were among the most prolific authors in Popular Electronics. Meyer had built a million dollar a year business that sold kits of parts to build the project that he and Lancaster wrote about. Mims and Roberts wanted to do the same and quizzed Solomon on the kit business. Solomon gave them some statistics but said there was no way of knowing how many kits an article would sell, maybe a hundred, maybe a thousand.

MITS had purchased components to build 200 Opticoms but only sold around 100 units. Roberts wanted to design a new electronic calculator kit but his partners wanted out. Bob Zaller had already left MITS and Forrest Mims was out of the Air Force and wanted to become a full-time writer. Roberts bought his 3 partners out for $600 in cash and $350 in equipment. (Roberts's four-year commitment to the Air Force ended in mid-1972.) Mims and Roberts remained friends and collaborated on books, magazines and instruction manuals.

== Calculators ==
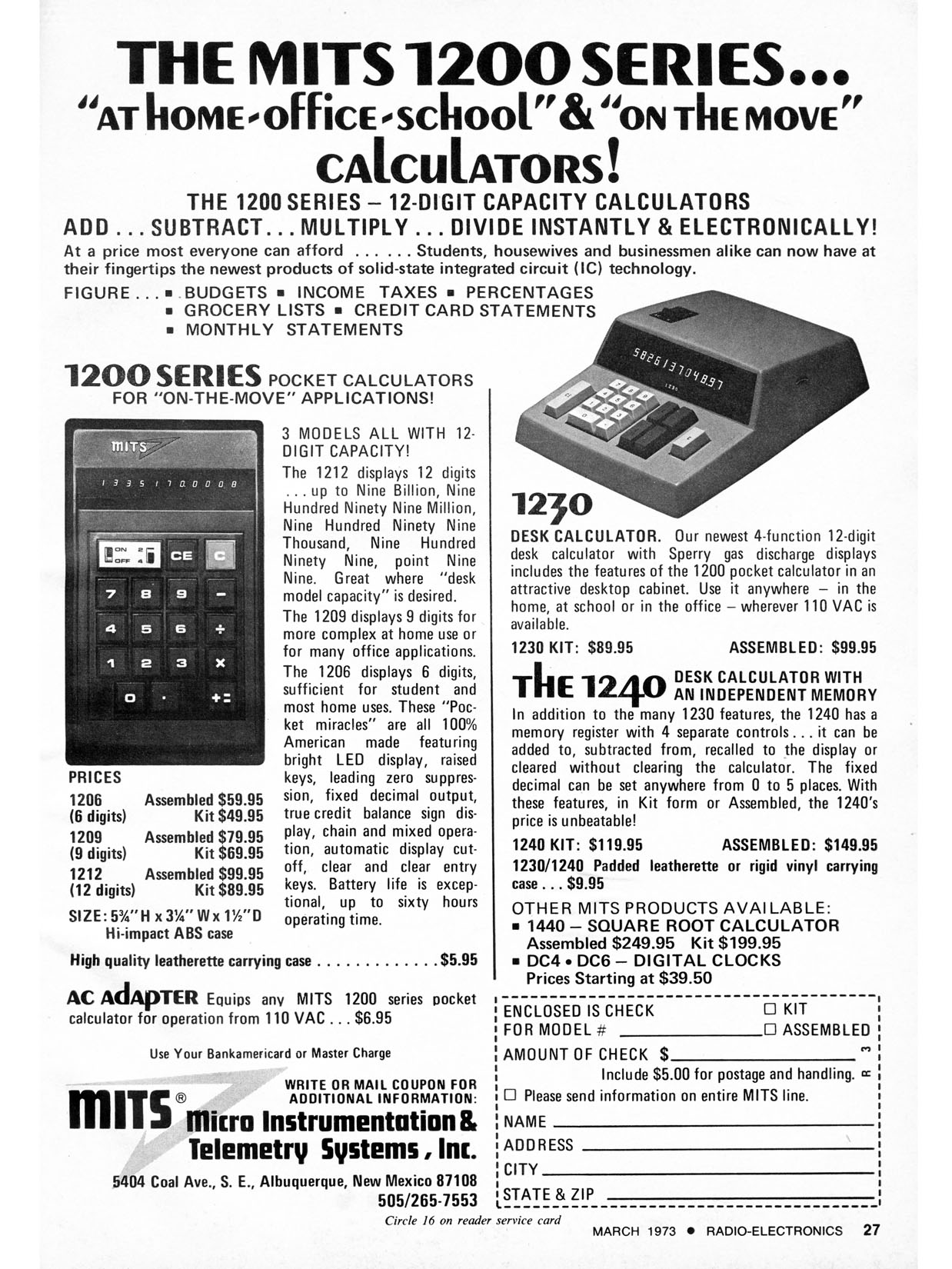
Sales had reached $100,000 per month when this advertisement ran in March 1973.

Ed Roberts's interest in computers began in high school when he built a simple digital computer from relays. His first real experience with computers came while at Oklahoma State University where engineering students had free access to an IBM 1620 computer. Roberts's office at Weapons Laboratory had the state of the art Hewlett-Packard 9100A programmable calculator in 1968. In July 1970, a semiconductor company, Electronic Arrays, announced a set of six LSI ICs that would make a four-function calculator. Roberts was determined to design a calculator kit.

To fund the new project, Roberts sold 15% of MITS to fellow Air Force officer, Lieutenant William Yates. He also got an investment from another Weapons Laboratory officer, Major Ed Laughlin. Several other officers and scientists at the lab were interested in this state of the art calculator kit and helped with the design. Forrest Mims wrote the assembly manual in return for a calculator kit.

The MITS 816 was known as a "four-function" calculator; it could add, subtract, multiply and divide. The display was only 8 digits but the calculations were done to 16 digits of accuracy. The custom molded case gave the kit a professional appearance; the kit was $179 and an assembled unit was $275. The MITS 816 was featured on the November 1971 cover of Popular Electronics. Thousands of calculator orders came in each month, in contrast to poor results for previous kits that MITS had offered.

The steady flow of calculator sales allowed MITS to run full page advertisements in Radio-Electronics, Popular Electronics and Scientific American. In the June 1972 Radio-Electronics, MITS announced a 14 digit calculator (Model 1440) with memory and square root function for $199.95 kit and $249.95 assembled. The original 816 kit was reduced from $179 to $149.95. Both calculators could be controlled by upcoming programming unit.

The monthly sales reached $100,000 in March 1973 and MITS moved to larger building with 10,000 square feet (930 square meters) of space. To meet the demand for assembled calculators, an automated wave solder machine was installed. In 1973 MITS was selling every calculator they could make; 110 employees worked in two shifts assembling calculators.

The functionality of calculator ICs increased at a rapid pace and Roberts was designing and producing new models. The MITS 7400 scientific and engineering calculator was introduced in December 1972. It featured trigonometric functions, polar to rectangular conversion, two memories, and up to a seven-level stack. A kit with a three-level stack was $299.95 and an assembled unit with a seven-level stack was $419.95. The next month the Series 1200 four-function pocket calculators were announced. The six-digit model was $59.95 and the twelve-digit model was $99.95.

The Programmer accessory had been mentioned in the earliest advertisement but it was not featured until March 1974. This was the same size as a desktop calculator and could hold 256 programming steps. (It could be expanded to 512 steps.) It was limited to emulating calculator key presses and simple sequence branching. The programming was done by entering hexadecimal key codes. The combination of the MITS 7440 calculator and the programmer was not nearly as sophisticated as the HP 9830 calculator but $400 for both kits was a fraction of the HP price.

=== MITS calculators ===
The feature and price information is from advertisements in Radio-Electronics magazine (issue date shown). The 816 price is from the original article in Popular Electronics.

| Model | Description | Introduced | Kit Price | Assembled |
|---|---|---|---|---|
| 816 | Desktop, 8-digit display, 16-digit calculations 4-function | Nov. 1971 | $179 | $275 |
| 1440 | Desktop, 14-digit display, square root, memory | Jun. 1972 | $199.95 | $249.95 |
| 816B | Desktop, 8-digit display, 16-digit calculations, 4-function | Jun. 1972 | $149.95 | $189.95 |
| 7400 | Desktop, 14-digit scientific. Trig functions, 3- (7400A), 5- (7400B), or 7-level stack (7400C) | Dec. 1972 | $339.95 | $419.95 |
| 1206 | Handheld, 6 digit display, 12-digit calculation, 4-function, | Jan. 1973 | $49.95 | $59.95 |
| 1209 | Handheld, 9 digit display, 12-digit calculation, 4-function, | Jan. 1973 | $69.95 | $79.95 |
| 1212 | Handheld, 12 digit, 4-function, | Jan. 1973 | $89.95 | $99.95 |
| 1230 | Handheld, 12 digit display, 4-function, | Jan. 1973 | $89.95 | $99.95 |
| 1240 | Handheld, 12 digit display, 4-function, memory | Jan. 1973 | $119.95 | $149.95 |
| 7440 | Desktop, 14-digit, scientific | Mar. 1973 | $199.95 | $299.95 |
| Programmer | 256 step programmer for 7440, 816, 1440, 908DM. | Mar. 1973 | $199.95 | $299.95 |
| 150 | Handheld, 8-digit, 4-function, square root, memory | Aug. 1973 | $119.95 | $149.95 |
| 941M | Handheld, 8-digit, 4-function, percent, metric conversions | Jan. 1974 | $129.95 | $149.95 |
| 908M | Handheld, 8-digit, 4-function, square root, memory | Jan. 1974 | $99.95 | $129.95 |
| 605M | Handheld, 6-digit, 4-function, percent | Jan. 1974 | $49.95 | $59.95 |
| 905M | Handheld, 8-digit, 4-function, percent | Jan. 1974 | $59.95 | $69.95 |
| 908DM | Desktop, 8-digit, 4-function, percent | Feb. 1974 | $129.95 | $149.95 |

=== Price wars ===
Bowmar Instrument Corporation introduced the "Bowmar Brain", a four-function pocket calculator, in September 1971 and the $179 calculator sold over 500,000 copies in the first year. Bowmar then developed the "901B" calculator that was priced at $120. In September 1972, Texas Instruments (TI) introduced the TI-2500 portable four-function calculator that also sold for $120. The 901B and the TI-2500 both used the TI TMS0100 family of "calculator-on-a-chip" integrated circuit. TI was now directly competing with their IC customers. Other semiconductor companies such as National Semiconductor and Rockwell began selling calculators. Commodore Business Machines and other office equipment companies also got into the market. A frenzied price war started. By early 1974, Ed Roberts found he could purchase a calculator in a retail store for less than his cost of materials. The larger companies could sell below cost to win market share. Bowmar lost $20 million in 1974 and filed for bankruptcy. Commodore acquired their IC supplier, MOS Technology. Texas Instruments won the price war but their calculator division lost $16 million in 1975.

To compete in this market, Roberts needed more capital. He took MITS public in November 1973 with a stock offering of 500,000 shares at $1 each. The 1973 oil crisis caused a stock market downturn and MITS was only able to sell 250,000 shares. This allowed MITS to pay off the existing debt, but did not allow for any expansion. Roberts had developed several test equipment products such as a Waveform Generator and a Digital Voltmeter so he attempted to appeal to kit builders again by featuring the test equipment and digital clocks in the advertisements, instead of calculators. MITS was losing money, and by July 1974, the full page prominent ads were replaced with quarter-page ads in the back of the magazine.

MITS was now $300,000 in debt and Roberts was looking for a new hit product. He decided to return to the kit market with a low cost computer. The target customer would think that "some assembly required" was a desirable feature. Roberts had looked at the Intel 4004 for calculators and thought the Intel 8008 was limited and difficult to work with, so he chose the most recent 8080 as the basis for his machine. The target price of this complete computer kit had to be under $400. To meet this price, Roberts agreed to order 1000 microprocessors from Intel for $75 each. Roberts and his head engineer, Bill Yates, began designing the computer. The company was down to 20 employees and a bank loan for $60,000 financed the design and initial production of the new computer.

== Popular Electronics and Radio-Electronics ==
In January 1972, Popular Electronics changed its editorial focus in an attempt to attract more advertising revenues. Reviews of stereo equipment and citizens band radio were featured; experimenter and constructions projects were gone. Dan Meyer, Don Lancaster, Forrest Mims, John Simonton and many other authors immediately started contributing to the competing Radio-Electronics magazine. The June 1972 cover story was "Experimenting with a $32 Solid State Laser" by Forrest Mims. Another article in that issue was "Experiments with Op-Amps" by B.R. Rogen; this was a pseudonym of Popular Electronics technical editor, Les Solomon. Solomon wrote articles for Radio-Electronics while working for Popular Electronics. Lou Garner, the longtime solid-state editor, moved to Radio-Electronics for a year. Several MITS kit projects were featured in Radio-Electronics including the ITC 1800 Integrated Circuit Tester (May 1972), the Model 1700 Function Generator (July 1973), the Model 1440 Calculator (July 1973) and the 88 VLCT Computer Terminal (November 1974).

Radio-Electronics had a smaller circulation than Popular Electronics but led the way with innovative construction projects between 1972 and 1975. John Simonton's first modular electronic music synthesizer was featured on the cover of the May 1973 issue. It sold for a fraction of commercial synthesizers and his PAiA Electronics produced them for decades. Don Lancaster's TV Typewriter in September 1973 and Jon Titus's Mark-8 computer in July 1974 were the catalyst of the home computer revolution.

Art Salsberg became the editor of Popular Electronics in 1974 with a goal of reclaiming the lead in projects. He wanted to publish a computer project that was more functional and elegant than the Mark-8. Les Solomon knew MITS was working on an Intel 8080 based computer project and thought Roberts could provide the project for the always popular January issue.

Ed Roberts and Bill Yates finished the first prototype in October 1974 and shipped it to Popular Electronics in New York via the Railway Express Agency. However, it never arrived due to a strike by the shipping company. Solomon already had a number of pictures of the machine and the article was based on them. Roberts got to work on building a replacement. The computer on the magazine cover is an empty box with just switches and LEDs on the front panel. The finished Altair computer had a completely different circuit board layout than the prototype shown in the magazine.

== Altair computer ==
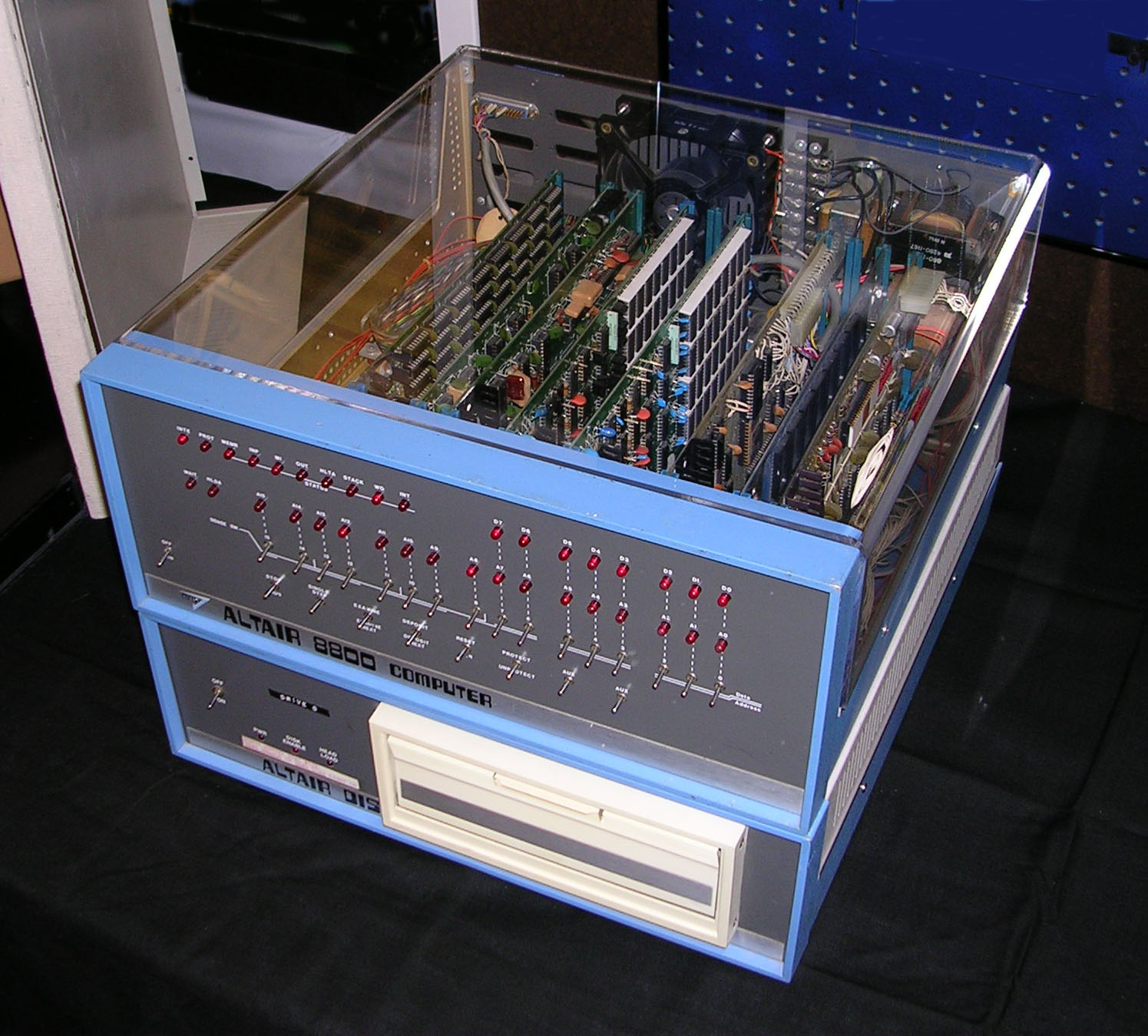
Altair 8800 Computer with 8 circuit boards installed. The Altair floppy disk system below has a Pertec 8-inch drive.

=== Products ===
The Altair 8800 was modeled after early 1970s minicomputers such as the Data General Nova. These machines contained a CPU board, memory boards, and I/O boards; the data storage and display terminal were external devices. The Teletype Model 33 ASR was a popular terminal because it provided printed output and data storage on punched paper tape. More advanced systems would have 8-inch floppy disks and a video terminal that would display 24 lines of 80 characters such as the ADM-3A. (No graphics were available and lower-case letters were a $75 option.) Most of these computers had a front panel with toggle switches for entering data and lights for displaying it. These were normally used to boot the computer and to diagnose problems.

The Altair 8800 kit came with a front panel, a CPU board with the Intel 8080 microprocessor, 256 bytes of RAM, a 4-slot backplane and an 8-amp power supply for $439. A 1k byte memory board was $176 and the 4k byte board was $264. The serial interface board was $124 and the parallel interface was $119. The Teletype Model 33 ASR was $1500. There was a special price for an 8k byte system with Altair BASIC (Microsoft's first ever product) for $995. Bill Gates and Paul Allen wrote Altair BASIC with Monte Davidoff contributing the Floating-point arithmetic routines. Altair BASIC initial developed from February 1975 to May 1975 and announced by MITS in July 1975, the 4k version on paper tape for $150, the 8k version with cassette support for $200 and the Extended 16k version with disk support (December 1975) for $350. To encourage selling more boards, Altair BASIC was discounted to $60, $75, $150 respectively, when bundled with 4k, 8k and I/O boards

When the January 1975 issue of Popular Electronics reached readers in mid December 1974, MITS was flooded with orders. They had to hire extra people just to answer the phones. In February, MITS received 1,000 orders for the Altair 8800. The quoted delivery time was 60 days but it was many more months before the machines were shipped. By August 1975, they had shipped over 5,000 computers.

The Altair 8800 computer was a break-even sale for MITS. They needed to sell additional memory boards, I/O boards and other options to make a profit. The April 1975 issue of the MITS newsletter, Computer Notes, had a page-long price list that offered over 15 optional boards. The delivery time given was 60 or 90 days, but many items were never produced and dropped from future price lists. Initially, Roberts decided to concentrate on production of the computers. Prompt delivery of optional boards did not occur until October 1975.

The Intel 8080 did not have dedicated circuitry to support dynamic random-access memory (DRAM) because in 1975, this type of memory was still a new technology. MITS wanted to use DRAM because it consumed less power than static RAM. However, they had several design and component problems that led to a high failure rate with their 4K Dynamic RAM board. By July, new companies such as Processor Technology were selling 4K Static RAM boards with the promise of reliable operation. MITS released its own 4K Static RAM board in January 1976.

The only floppy disk drives that were readily available in 1975 were IBM compatible 8-inch drives. MITS selected the Pertec FD400 disk drive which could store over 300,000 bytes of data. The Altair disk controller occupied two boards and had over 60 ICs. The initial units were to be available in August, but were delayed until the end of 1975. The production version of Extended Disk BASIC was released in April 1976. The controller with one disk drive sold for $1,480 (kit) and $1,980 (assembled).

=== Marketing ===
Bill Gates was a regular contributor to Computer Notes. The MITS-Mobile van traveled all over the US including a stop near the Homebrew Computer Club.

The first full page advertisements for the Altair computer appeared in the February issues of Popular Electronics and Radio-Electronics magazines. Soon MITS was advertising in technical journals such as the IEEE Computer, and general interest magazines such as Scientific American. MITS was also the most prominent advertiser in the new hobbyist computer magazines such as Creative Computing and Byte.

David Bunnell joined MITS as a technical writer in the calculator heyday. In April 1975 he created a newsletter so the MITS staff could easily communicate with the customers. The newsletter, Computer Notes, was available to customers and other interested readers. It was a large format newsletter; 11.25 by 15.5 inches (286 by 394 mm), and each issue had 8 to 24 pages. In January 1977, it switched to a smaller magazine format and the last issue was produced in January 1978. Bunnell started Personal Computer magazine in October 1976 and went on to a successful career as a magazine publisher.

Computer Notes featured a wide variety of authors. Bill Gates and Paul Allen were regular contributors to the early issues. They wrote about Altair Basic and general software topics. Ed Roberts wrote a monthly "Letter from the President" column where he would answer customer questions and even review competing products. MITS engineers, such as Tom Durston and Steve Pollini, would give technical descriptions of new products. Altair owners would contribute software and hardware suggestions and occasionally a complete article.

MITS purchased a camper van in April 1975 and outfitted it with an Altair system complete with floppy disk, a Teletype Model 33 and every accessory MITS produced. The "MITS-MOBILE" was literally a showroom on wheels that would travel from city to city showcasing the MITS product line. They would hold seminars at hotel conference rooms that would draw crowds of over 200 people. The most notable seminar was at Rickey's Hyatt House in Palo Alto, California in early June 1975, where a member of the Homebrew Computer Club left with an unreleased copy of Altair BASIC. After retail computer stores were established in most cities, the "MITS-MOBILE" was retired.

The first (and only) World Altair Computer Convention was held in Albuquerque, New Mexico in March 1976. The convention, organized by David Bunnell, was an overwhelming success; with 700 people from 46 states and seven countries attending. Many of the attendees would go on to become leaders of the personal computer revolution.

=== Clones ===
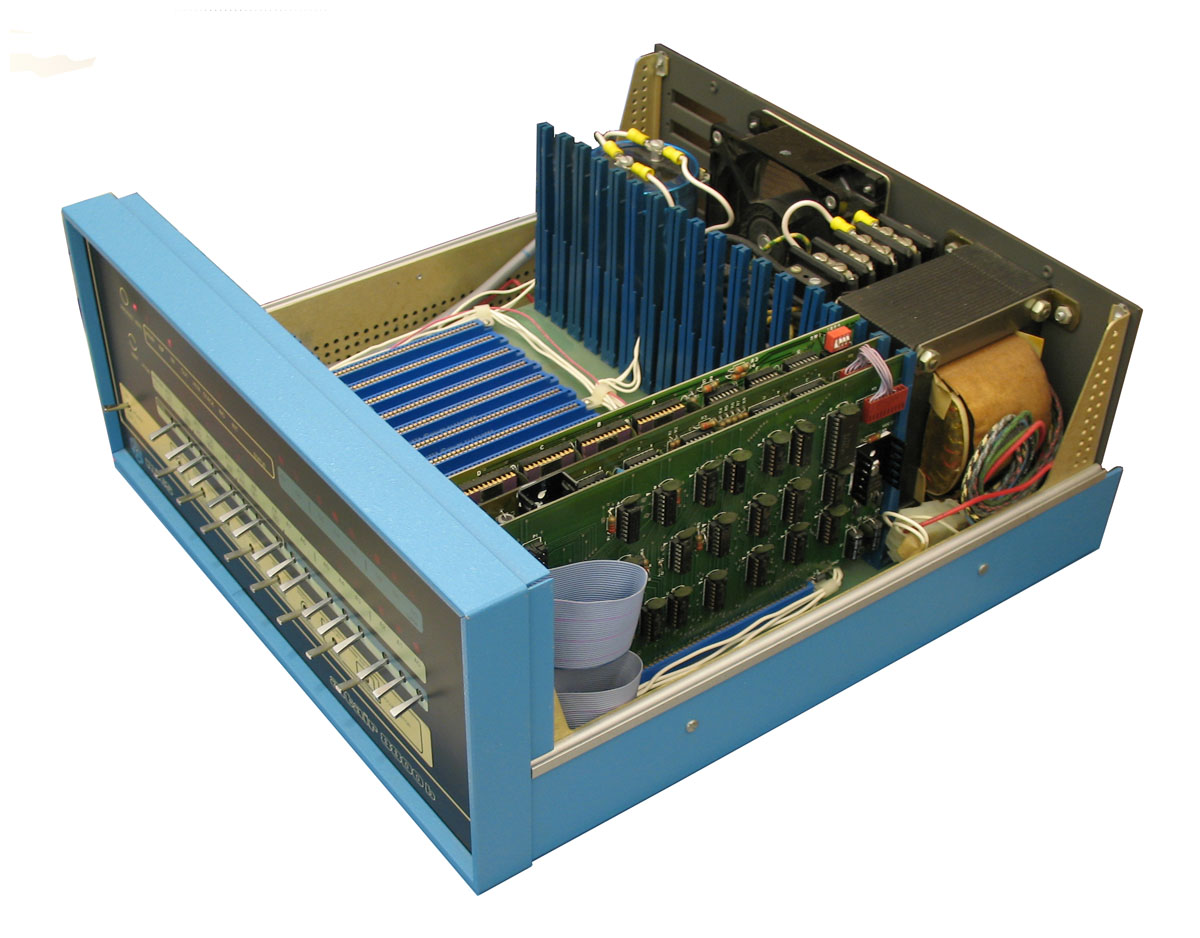
Many companies made boards that could plug into the Altair / S-100 bus.

Owners of mainframe systems and minicomputers could purchase additional memory, interface boards and peripherals from third party suppliers; so it was predictable that owners of the Altair 8800 computer would do the same. MITS's delays in delivery of systems and accessories accelerated the formation of Altair compatible suppliers. The first ones started appearing in mid-1975 and by July 1976 complete computer systems were readily available. The technical manuals for the Altair 8800 provided electrical schematics of the 100 pin computer bus allowing others to design compatible boards. There was not a proper technical standard at the time and some "compatible" boards did not work with other "compatible" boards. Later, the industry developed the S-100 bus standard.

Bill Godbout Electronics in Oakland, CA was the parts supplier to many of the hobbyists and students from Berkeley. George Morrow approached Godbout with several Altair compatible designs that Godbout agreed to produce and sell. The October 1975 Byte magazine carried an advertisement headlining "Get your MITTS on a Godbout RAM kit." The 4K byte Altair compatible board was $131.07.

Godbout also sold components to Processor Technology for their 4K Static RAM board and serial / parallel interface board. Lee Felsenstein designed an Altair compatible video board that provided 16 lines of 64 upper and lower case characters on a black and white television. This $160 board became very popular and led to the Processor Technology Sol-20 Computer in 1976.

The IMSAI 8080, the first "clone" of the Altair computer, was released in December 1975. It corrected many shortcomings of the original Altair 8800 by providing a larger power supply, a 22 slot motherboard, and easier wiring of the front panel. Ed Roberts reviewed the IMSAI in his April 1976 column in Computer Notes, and agreed that the IMSAI was in some ways better than the original Altair. Roberts also pointed out that the new Altair 8800B was superior to the IMSAI 8080 and the upgraded Altair 8800A fixed the same issues that the IMSAI did.

Altair computers were only available from the 20 or so authorized Altair computer dealers, but the IMSAI 8080, Processor Technology Sol and many other clones were sold by hundreds of newly opening computer stores.

The S-100 bus was used throughout the 1980s until it was overtaken by the IBM PC ISA bus. Seattle Computer Products (SCP) was a manufacturer of S-100 memory boards. The company's engineer, Tim Paterson, designed an Intel 8086 CPU system on two S-100 boards in 1979. Microsoft, then in nearby Bellevue, Washington, used the prototype machine to test their 8086 version of BASIC. Digital Research had promised to deliver an 8086 version of their CP/M operating system by December 1979 but missed that date. SCP needed a disk operating system to sell its 8086 products so Paterson wrote QDOS, a "Quick and Dirty Operating System" in three months. Microsoft would later purchase QDOS from SCP for $50,000 and use it as the basis for the IBM PC DOS.

=== Altair BASIC ===
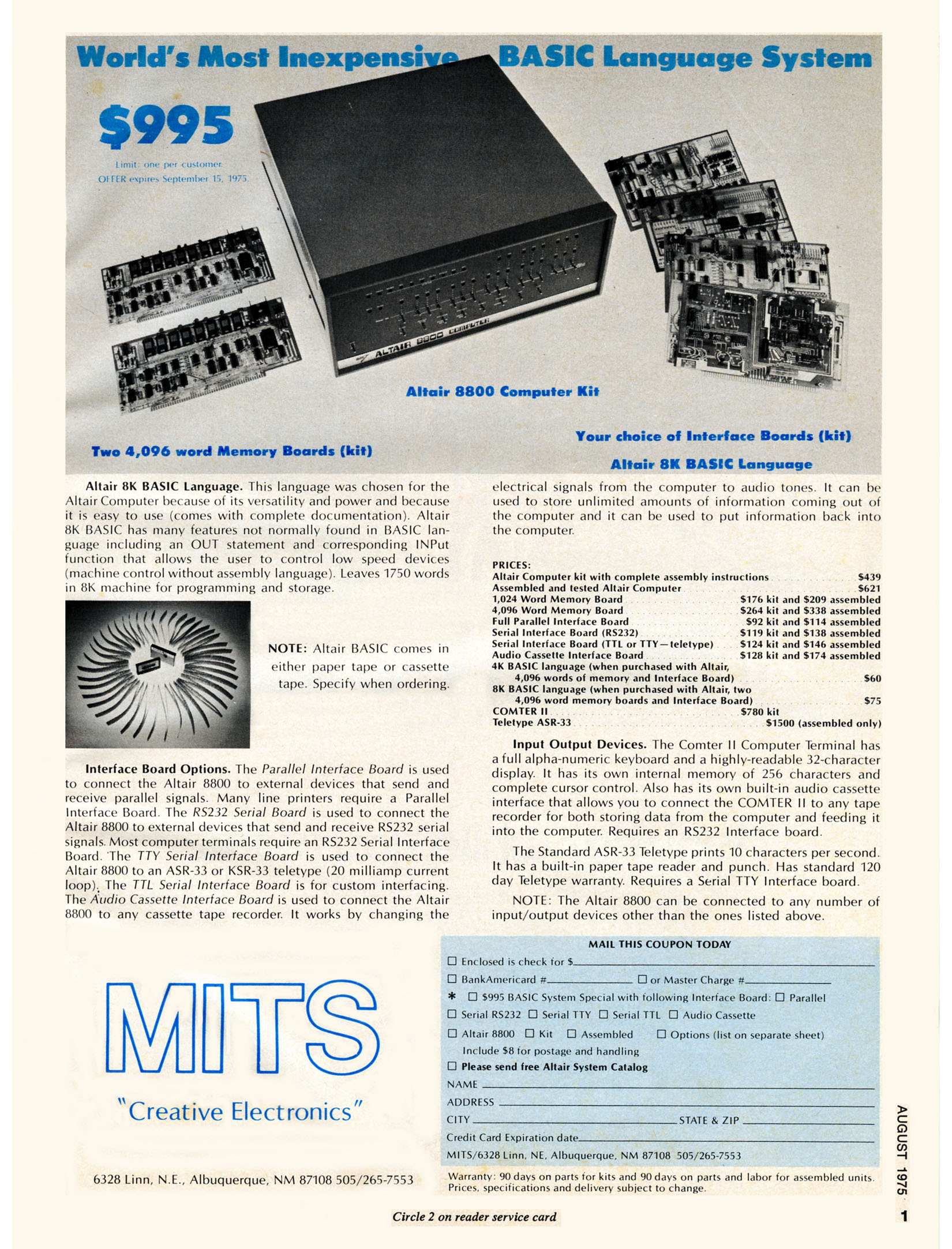
An Altair 8800 kit with 8 KB of memory and Altair BASIC cost only $995 in August 1975.

In December 1974 Bill Gates was a student at Harvard University and Paul Allen worked for Honeywell in Boston. They saw the Altair 8800 computer in the January 1975 issue of Popular Electronics and knew it was powerful enough to support a BASIC interpreter. They wanted to be the first to offer BASIC for the Altair computer, and the software development tools they had previously created for their Intel 8008 microprocessor based Traf-O-Data computer would give them a head start. While their friend, Paul Gilbert, was building the computer, Allen wrote a program that ran on a DEC PDP-10 time-sharing computer that simulated the 8008 system. He also modified DEC's macro assembler to produce the machine code for the 8008 microprocessor. The Traf-O-Data software could be written and debugged before the computer hardware was complete. Gates and Allen worked at TRW where they had unlimited access to a PDP-10.

Harvard had a DEC PDP-10 that was available for student use. They would use it to develop BASIC. While Allen modified their development software for the new 8080 microprocessor, Gates began writing 8080 assembly language by hand on yellow legal pads. They enlisted another Harvard student, Monte Davidoff, to write the math routines.

By early February the program coding switched from legal pads to the PDP-10 and a preliminary version was completed by March 1975. Gates and Allen had been in contact with Roberts and MITS and the older looking Paul Allen would travel to Albuquerque in March. MITS needed more time to get a computer with 7k bytes of memory working, and they needed more time to get the software finished. When Allen arrived at MITS it took a day to get the software running; Allen remembers this being caused by computer memory problems while Roberts remembers the delay was due to software problems.

The April 1975 issue of the Altair Newsletter, Computer Notes, had a banner headline "Altair BASIC - Up and Running". The software was to begin shipping on June 23, 1975. The software price was $500, but discounted to $75 with the purchase of an Altair computer with 8k bytes of memory and a serial I/O card.

On July 22, 1975 MITS signed a contract for the Altair BASIC with Bill Gates and Paul Allen. They received $3000 at signing and a royalty for each copy of BASIC sold; $30 for the 4K version, $35 for the 8K version and $60 for the expanded version. The contract had a cap of $180,000. MITS received an exclusive worldwide license to the program for 10 years. They also had exclusive rights to sub-license the program to other companies and agreed to use its "best efforts" to license, promote and commercialize the program. MITS would supply the computer time necessary for development; a PDP-10 owned by the Albuquerque school district. Paul Allen left his job at Honeywell and became the Vice President and Director of Software at MITS with a salary of $30,000 per year. Bill Gates was still a student at Harvard and just a contractor with MITS. The October 1975 company newsletter gives his title as "Software Specialist".

The price of Altair BASIC to customers who purchased additional memory and I/O boards from MITS was $75. Users may have gone along with that if the memory board were reliable. Customers bought the computer from MITS, and working memory from companies like Processor Technology. Rather than pay $500 for BASIC, they would acquire bootleg copies of the software. Only about ten percent of the early customers actually purchased BASIC. With a royalty due of $30 per copy, Gates felt that the computer hobbyist were stealing money from him. In February 1976 Bill Gates, "General Partner, Micro-Soft", wrote an "Open Letter to Hobbyists" that was sent to every computer publication insinuating that the hobbyists were thieves.

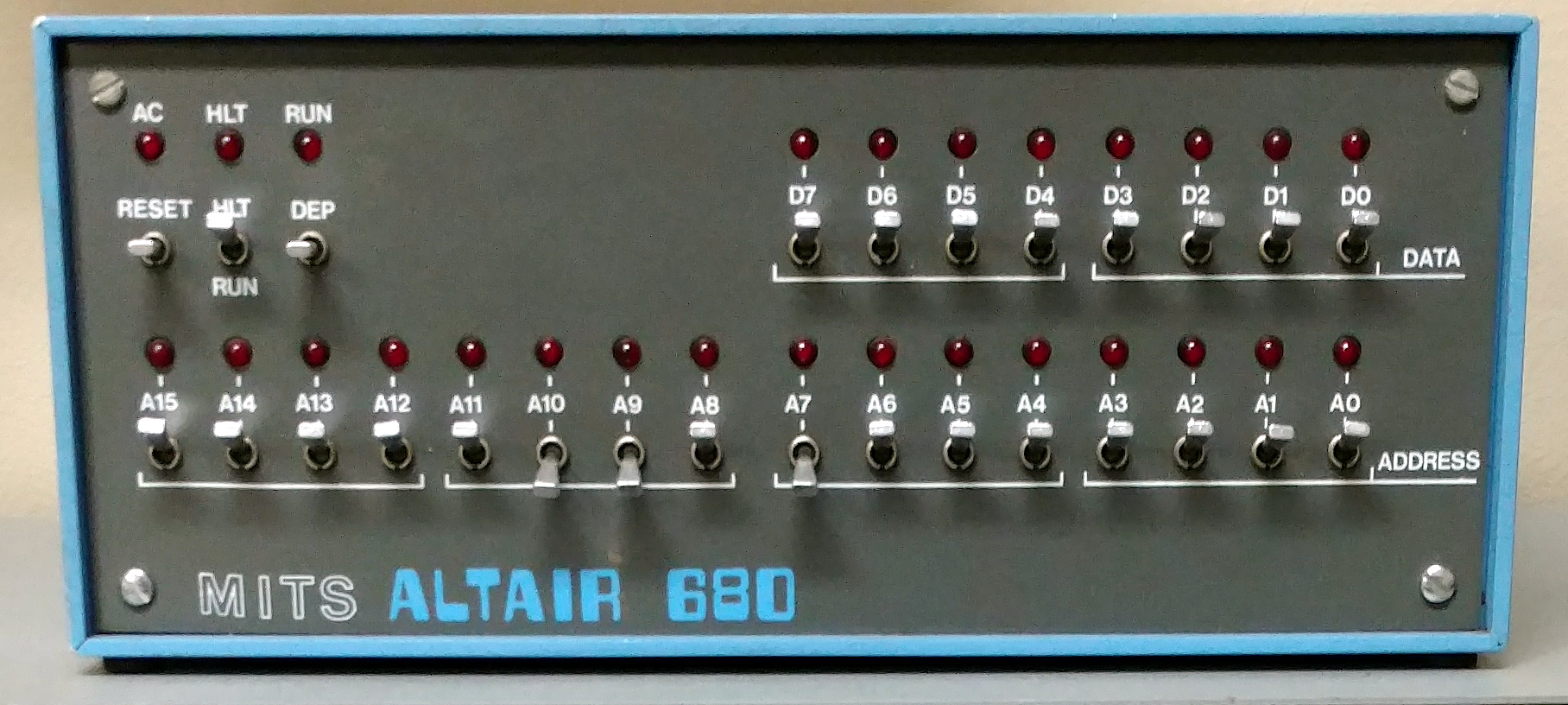
Altair 680

MITS had announced a new computer based on the Motorola 6800 microprocessor in November 1975, the Altair 680. The machines were supposed to ship in January 1976, but hardware design problems delayed shipment until May. Paul Allen rewrote their 8080 simulator to support the 6800 microprocessor. Ric Weiland, a high school friend of Gates and Allen, converted the Altair BASIC's 8080 assembly language to 6800 assembly language. To eliminate the per copy royalty loss issue, the 6800 BASIC was licensed to MITS on a non-exclusive basis for a flat fee of $31,200. Weiland and Marc McDonald were impressed with the new MOS Technology 6502 microprocessor that was a derivative of the 6800. They modified the 6800 development system to support the 6502 and "cranked out" a 6502 edition of BASIC. This version was later sold to Commodore and Apple.

The January 1976 issue of MITS's newsletter, Computer Notes, carried an ad for 8080 BASIC. The last paragraph stated: "Licenses for source listing and rights to distribute the binaries are also available to OEM buyers. Write or call Mr. Paul Allen at the MITS plant in Albuquerque for more detailed information." Microsoft found several corporate customers for BASIC and proceeds were evenly split with MITS. Pertec acquired MITS in December 1976 and refused to allow any more OEM deals, even though the agreement required MITS to use their "best efforts" to license the software. The contract required MITS and Microsoft to use binding arbitration to settle disputes. In September 1977, the arbitrator ruled in favor of Microsoft, MITS could continue to use BASIC on their machines but lost the exclusive license. Microsoft could license the software to anyone and keep all of the royalties.

There was no longer a business requirement to remain in Albuquerque so Microsoft wanted to relocate to a larger city that would be more attractive to new employees. The San Francisco bay area was considered but Allen and Gates decided to return home to Seattle. Microsoft moved to Bellevue, Washington in January 1979.

== Sale to Pertec ==
Logo of MITS under ownership of Pertec

In 1976, MITS had 230 employees and sales of $6 million. Roberts was tiring of his management responsibilities and was looking for a larger partner. MITS had always used Pertec Computer Corporation disk drives and on December 3, 1976, Pertec signed a letter of intent to acquire MITS for $6 million in stock. The deal was completed in May 1977 just before the National Computer Conference in Dallas, Texas. Roberts got $2 million and the other 500 MITS shareholders (including the Altair co-designer, William Yates) split the rest.

Pertec was eager to increase sales to small businesses through the 26 Altair Computer stores across the United States. The marketing toward hobby/home user was curtailed. The November 1977 issue of the MITS newsletter, Computer Notes, was the last produced by the Albuquerque staff. There was one more issue produced by the Pertec staff in Chatsworth, California. The back cover of the leading home computer magazine, Byte, always carried a full page Altair advertisement. This ended with the September 1977 issue. Roberts and Yates stayed on and worked on special projects.

In August 1979, Pertec agreed to sell a 45% stake to North American Philips for $37 million. Before the deal was complete, Pertec agreed to be acquired by the West German computer company, Triumph-Adler, for $120 million. In 1978, Pertec had sales of $150 million and Triumph-Adler had sales of $466 million.

The Altair products were merged into the Pertec line and the MITS facility was used to produce the PCC-2000 small-business computer. The Albuquerque plant was closed in December 1980 and the production was moved to Pertec plants in Irvine, California.

By the end of 1977 Roberts left MITS and returned to Georgia to be a gentleman farmer. He studied medicine at Mercer University in Macon, Georgia and graduated with a M.D. in 1986. Roberts practiced medicine in Cochran, Georgia until his death in 2010.

== Works cited ==
- Ceruzzi, Paul E. (2003). A History of Modern Computing. Cambridge, MA: MIT Press. ISBN 0-262-53203-4.
- Manes, Stephen; Andrews, Paul (1994). Gates. New York: Simon and Schuster. ISBN 978-0-671-88074-3.
- Mims, Forrest M (1986). Siliconnections: Coming of Age in the Electronic Era. New York: McGraw-Hill. ISBN 978-0-07-042411-1.
- Roberts, H. Edward; Mims, Forrest (1974). Electronic Calculators. Indianapolis: Howard W Sams. ISBN 978-0-672-21039-6.
- Young, Jeffrey S. (1998). "Chapter 6 Mechanics: Kits & Microcomputers". Forbes Greatest Technology Stories: Inspiring Tales of the Entrepreneurs. New York: John Wiley & Sons. ISBN 0-471-24374-4.
