= Microsoft BASIC =

Programming language

- Designed by: Microsoft
- Developer: Microsoft
- First appeared: 1975 (cf. Altair BASIC)
- Stable release: cf. Visual Basic .NET / 2018

Microsoft BASIC is the foundation software product of the Microsoft company and evolved into a line of BASIC interpreters and compiler(s) adapted for many different microcomputers. It first appeared in 1975 as Altair BASIC, which was the first version of BASIC published by Microsoft as well as the first high-level programming language available for the Altair 8800 microcomputer.

During the home computer craze of the late-1970s and early-1980s, Microsoft BASIC was ported to and supplied with many home computer designs. Slight variations to add support for machine-specific functions, especially graphics, led to a profusion of related designs like Commodore BASIC and Atari Microsoft BASIC.

As the early home computers gave way to newer designs like the IBM Personal Computer and Macintosh, BASIC was no longer as widely used, although it retained a strong following. The release of Visual Basic rebooted its popularity and it remains in wide use on Microsoft Windows platforms in its most recent incarnation, Visual Basic .NET.

== Altair BASIC and early microcomputers ==
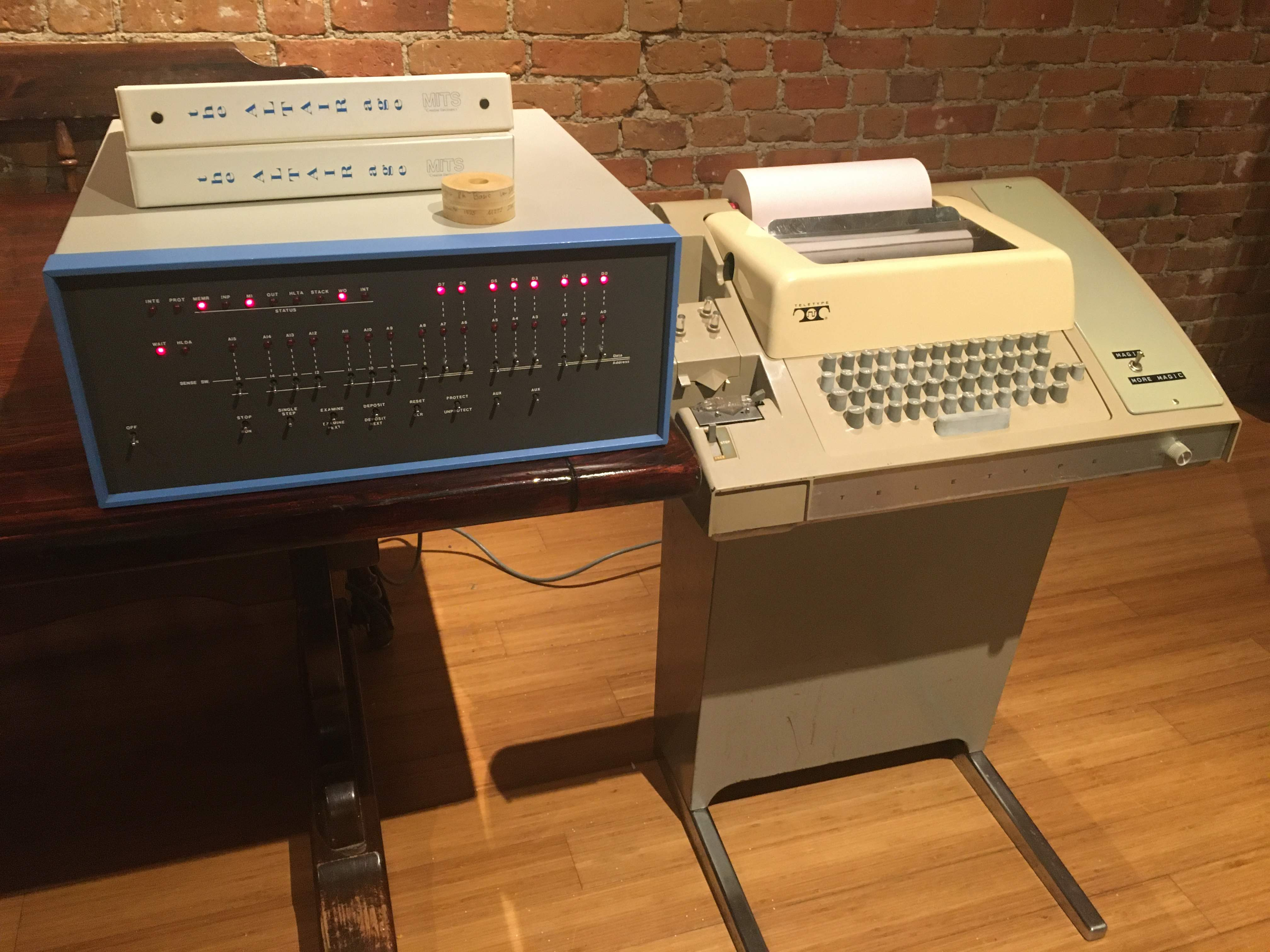
A kit-build Altair 8800 computer with the popular Model 33 ASR (Automatic Send and Receive) Teletype as terminal, paper tape reader, and paper tape punch

The Altair BASIC interpreter was developed by Microsoft founders Paul Allen and Bill Gates using a self-written Intel 8080 emulator running on a PDP-10 minicomputer. The MS dialect is patterned on Digital Equipment Corporation's BASIC-PLUS on the PDP-10, which Gates had used in high school. The first versions supported integer math only, but Monte Davidoff convinced them that floating-point arithmetic was possible, and wrote a library which became the Microsoft Binary Format.

In the Microsoft BASIC family of 8-bit interpreters (Altair BASIC, TRS-80 BASIC, etc), features and commands inspired by DEC's PDP-10 BASIC-PLUS include: the single byte tokens for keywords, % for integers, $ for strings, 4-byte floating points Microsoft Binary Format, : statement separator, # for file handles, random file access (FIELD, GET, PUT, LSET, RSET), and more. Microsoft's BASIC builtin line editor, the EDIT command, was inspired by the TOPS-10 EDIT text editor's Alter subcommand.

Altair BASIC was delivered on paper tape and in its original version took 4 KB of memory. The following functions and statements were available:

LIST, NEW, PRINT, INPUT, IF...THEN, FOR...NEXT, SQR, RND, SIN, LET, USR, DATA, READ, REM, CLEAR, STOP, TAB, RESTORE, ABS, END, INT, RETURN, STEP, GOTO, and GOSUB.

There were no string variables in 4K BASIC and single-precision 32-bit floating point was the only numeric type supported. Variable names consisted of one letter (A–Z) or one letter followed by one digit (0–9), thus allowing up to 286 numeric variables.

For machines with more memory, the 8 KB version added 31 additional statements and support for string variables and their related operations like MID$ and string concatenation. String variables were denoted with a $ suffix, which remained in later versions of the language. Later on, Microsoft released the 12K Extended BASIC, which included double precision 64-bit variables, IF…THEN…ELSE structures, user defined functions, more advanced program editing commands, and descriptive error messages as opposed to error numbers. Numeric variables now had three basic types, % denoted 16-bit integers, # denoted 64-bit doubles, and ! denoted 32-bit singles, but this was the default format so the ! is rarely seen in programs.

The extended 8 KB version was then generalized into BASIC-80 (8080/85, Z80), and ported into BASIC-68 (6800), BASIC-69 (6809), and 6502-BASIC. The 6502 had somewhat less dense assembler code and expanded in size to just under 8K for the single precision version, or 9K for a version using an intermediate 40-bit floating point format in place of the original 32-bit version. This new 40-bit format became the most common as it was used on most 6502-based machines of the era. It was also ported to the 16-bit BASIC-86 (8086/88).

The final major release of BASIC-80 was version 5.x, which appeared in 1981 and added support for 40-character variable names, WHILE…WEND loops, dynamic string allocation, and several other features. BASIC 5.x removed the ability to crunch program lines.

The core command set and syntax are the same in all implementations of Microsoft BASIC and, generally speaking, a program can be run on any version if it does not use hardware-specific features or double precision numbers (not supported in some implementations).

== Licenses to home computer makers ==
After the initial success of Altair BASIC, Microsoft BASIC became the basis for a lucrative software licensing business, being ported to numerous home and other personal computers of the 1970s and especially the 1980s, and extended along the way. Contrary to the original Altair BASIC, most home computer BASICs are resident in ROM, and are available on the machines at power-on in the form of the characteristic "READY". prompt. This contributed to Microsoft's and other variants of BASIC becoming a commonplace part of the user interface of many home computers' rudimentary operating systems.

Microsoft used its DECsystem-20 to produce assembly code for dozens of different computer systems and CPUs from the same source code, using conditional compilation. By 1981, Microsoft BASIC was so popular that even companies that already had a BASIC licensed the language, such as IBM for its Personal Computer, and Atari, which sold both Atari Microsoft BASIC and its own Atari BASIC. IBM's Don Estridge said, "Microsoft BASIC had hundreds of thousands of users around the world. How are you going to argue with that?" Microsoft licensed similar versions to companies that competed with each other. After licensing IBM Advanced BASIC (BASICA) to IBM, for example, Microsoft licensed the compatible GW-BASIC to makers of PC clones, and sold copies to retail customers. The company similarly licensed an Applesoft-compatible BASIC to VTech for its Laser 128 clone.

=== Extended BASIC-80 ===
- Tangerine Microtan 65
- Spectravideo SV-318 and SV-328

Known variants:

- NCR Basic Plus 6, released in the first quarter of 1977 for the NCR 7200 model VI data-entry terminal. The adaptation of Microsoft's Extended BASIC-80 was carried out by Marc McDonald in 1976/1977.

=== Disk BASIC-80 ===
MBASIC is available for CP/M-80 and ISIS-II. Also available for TEKDOS.

MBASIC is a stripped-down BASIC-80 with only hardware-neutral functions. However, due to the popularity of CP/M, the great majority of Z80 machines ran MBASIC, rather than a version customized for specific hardware (TRS-80 BASIC was one of the few exceptions). Microsoft's CP/M card for the Apple II included a modified version of MBASIC that incorporated some of the graphics commands from Applesoft BASIC, such as HPLOT, but the full command set is not supported.

=== Standalone Disk BASIC-80 ===
The first implementation to use an 8-bit variant of the File Allocation Table (FAT) was a BASIC adaptation (Note: Sources differ in regard to the first NCR data entry terminal integrating support for the FAT file system. According to Stephen Manes and Paul Andrews, "Gates", development was for a NCR 8200 in late 1977, incorrectly classified as a floppy-based upgrade to the NCR 7200, which had been released in 1975-11 and was built around an Intel 8080 8-bit processor, but was cassette-based only. However, the NCR Century 8200 was a 16-bit minicomputer, onto which several data entry terminals could be hooked up. Marc McDonald even remembered a NCR 8500, a mainframe of the Criterion series, which can be ruled out as well. Other sources indicate that either the NCR 7200 itself or its successor were the actual target platform. The NCR 7500 series was released in 1978, based on a similar 8080 hardware, but now including NCR 7520 and 7530 models featuring 8-inch diskettes. NCR Basic +6, a precursor or adaptation of Microsoft Standalone Disk BASIC-80 was available for them at least since 1979. One source claims that a special NCR 7200 model variant with two 8-inch diskettes and Microsoft BASIC existed and was imported by NCR Sydney into Australia the least.) for an Intel 8080-based NCR 7200, 7520, or 7530 data-entry terminal with 8-inch floppy disks in 1977/1978.

=== BASIC compiler ===
Microsoft offered a BASIC compiler for BASIC-80 under CP/M, by 1980 or before. The compiler executable was named BASCOM or BASCOM32.

=== TRS-80 Level II/III BASIC ===
The TRS-80 computer was offered initially with an adaption of Li-Chen Wang's Tiny BASIC (Level I BASIC); within a few months this was replaced by a port of BASIC-80 which incorporated some of Level I BASIC's command set, particularly the commands for setting graphics characters. Level II BASIC contained some of the features of Extended BASIC, although due to the need to include Level I commands such as SET and PSET, other features such as descriptive error messages still had to be left out; these were subsequently added into TRS-80 Disk BASIC.

The TRS-80 Model 4 had a newer disk-based BASIC that used the BASIC-80 5.x core, which included support for 40-character variable names. Thus the ability to crunch program lines (without spaces between keywords and arguments) was no longer possible as it had been in Level II. It was no longer necessary to reserve string space. New features included user defined functions (DEF FN) and access to TRSDOS 6 system functions via a SYSTEM keyword. A modified version published later by OS provider Logical Systems, in the LS-DOS Version 6.3 update, added single-letter access to BASIC control functions (like LIST and EDIT) and direct access to LS-DOS supervisor calls. The program edit environment was still line-oriented. The facility available in Level II to sort arrays (CMD"O") was not available; programmers and users had to devise their own workarounds.

=== BASIC-86 ===
The first implementation as a standalone disk-based language system was for Seattle Computer Products S-100 bus 8086 CPU card in 1979. It was using an 8-bit FAT file system.

Microsoft also offered a version of Standalone BASIC-86 for SBC-86/12 for Intel's 8086 Single Board Computer platform in 1980.

=== 6502 BASIC ===
Microsoft ported BASIC-80 to the 6502 during the summer of 1976; it was mostly a straight port of the 8K version of BASIC-80 and included the same prompts asking for memory size and if the user wanted floating point functions enabled or not (having them active used an extra 135 bytes of memory). The earliest machines to use 6502 BASIC were the Ohio Scientific Model 500 and KIM-1 in 1977. 6502 BASIC included certain features from Extended BASIC such as user-defined functions and descriptive error messages, but omitted other features like double precision variables and the PRINT USING statement. As compensation for not having double precision variables, Microsoft included 40-bit floating point support instead of BASIC-80's 32-bit floating point and string allocation was dynamic (thus the user did not have to reserve string space like in BASIC-80). However, vendors could still request BASIC with 32-bit floating point for a slightly smaller memory footprint; as one example, Disk BASIC for the Atari 8-bits used 32-bit floating point rather than 40-bit.

Standard features of the 9K version of Microsoft 6502 BASIC included:

- GET statement to detect a key press.
- Line crunching – program lines do not require any spaces except between the line number and statement.
- Only supported variable types are character string, single precision floating point, and 16-bit signed integer (saves space in arrays, otherwise useless and slower than floating point, as all calculations are done in floating point anyway).
- Long variable names can be used, but only the first two characters are significant.
- Dynamic string allocation.

6502 BASIC lacked a standardized set of commands for disk and printer output; these were up to the vendor to add and varied widely with each implementation.

Later implementations of 6502 BASIC (1983–) had many vendor specific improvements; for example later versions of Commodore BASIC had the following:

- Disk commands (DIRECTORY, DSAVE, DLOAD, BACKUP, HEADER, SCRATCH, COLLECT, DVERIFY, COPY, DELETE, RENAME, etc.)
- Graphics commands (CIRCLE, DRAW, BOX, COLOR (of background, border, etc.), PAINT, SCALE)
- Graphics block copy and logical operation with the existing graphical screen (SSHAPE and GSHAPE with OR, AND, XOR, etc.)
- Sprite definition, displaying and animation commands on C128, even saving sprites to binaries
- Sound commands (VOL, SOUND), later on at C=128 Music commands (ADSR and SID filter programming (ENVELOPE and FILTER), PLAY, TEMPO commands)
- Signs of more structured programming: IF–THEN–ELSE, DO–LOOP–WHILE/UNTIL–EXIT.
- Extended I/O commands for special features: JOY, function keys
- Debugging commands: STOP, CONT, TRON, TROFF, RESUME
- Extended handling of character screen: WINDOW
- Support easier program development: RENUMBER, NEW, MONITOR, RREG

=== BASIC-68 and BASIC-69 ===
Microsoft catalogs from the 1980s also showed the availability of BASIC-68 and BASIC-69 for the Motorola 6800 and 6809 microprocessors respectively, running the FLEX operating systems, and also mention OEM versions for Perkin-Elmer, Ohio Nuclear, Pertec and Societe Occitane d'Electronique systems. It seems likely this is what is also the basis for the Microsoft/Epson BASIC in the Epson HX-20 portable computer, which has two Hitachi 6301 CPUs, which are essentially a "souped up" 6801. Most of the core features in BASIC-68 and BASIC-69 were copied directly from BASIC-80.

BASIC-69 was notably also licensed to Tandy, where it formed the nucleus of Color BASIC on the TRS-80 Color Computer. Not to be confused with BASIC09, a very different BASIC created by Microware as the main language for its OS-9, the other OS available on the Color Computer (Microware also wrote version 2.0 of Extended Color BASIC when Microsoft refused to do it). Microsoft BASIC was also included in the Dragon 32 / 64 computers that were built in Wales and enjoyed some limited success in the UK home computer market in the early 1980s. Dragon computers were mostly compatible with the Color Computer, as they were built on very similar hardware.

=== MSX ===
Microsoft produced a ROM-based MSX BASIC for use in MSX home computers, which used a Z80 processor. This version supported the graphics and sound systems of the MSX computers; some variants also had support for disk drives.

== Modern descendants ==
No variety of Microsoft BASIC (BASICA, GW-BASIC, QuickBASIC, QBasic) is currently distributed with Microsoft Windows or DOS. However, versions that will still run on modern machines can be downloaded from various Internet sites or be found on old DOS disks.

The latest incarnation of Microsoft BASIC is Visual Basic .NET, which incorporates some features from C++ and C# and can be used to develop Web forms, Windows forms, console applications and server-based applications. Most .NET code samples are presented in VB.NET as well as C#, and VB.NET continues to be favored by former Visual Basic programmers.

In October 2008, Microsoft released Small Basic. The language has only 14 keywords. Small Basic Version 1.0 (12 June 2011) was released with an updated Microsoft MSDN Web site that included a full teacher curriculum, a Getting Started Guide, and several e-books. Small Basic exists to help students as young as age eight learn the foundations of computer programming and then graduate to Visual Basic via the downloadable software, Visual Studio Express, where they can continue to build on the foundation by learning Visual C#, VB.NET, and Visual C++.

== Source code ==
Bill Gates released Microsoft's original source code, written in 8080 assembly and originally running on an Intel 8080 emulator on a PDP-10 mainframe at Harvard, to celebrate Microsoft's 50th anniversary. This code, which Gates considers his "coolest," was inspired by the Altair 8800 and involved creating a BASIC interpreter and simulating the Intel 8080 chip. The 157-page PDF of the scanned code is available for viewing, offering a glimpse into Microsoft's early history.

In September 2025, Microsoft open-sourced 6502 BASIC.

== Variants and derivatives of Microsoft BASIC ==
- Altair BASIC (MITS Altair and other S-100 computers)
- Amiga BASIC (Commodore Amiga family)
- Applesoft BASIC (Apple II family)
- Atari Microsoft BASIC I and II (Atari 8-bit computers)
- Basic 1.0 (Thomson computer family)
- BASICA ("BASIC Advanced") (PC DOS, on IBM PC)
- Canon X-07 (Canon portable pocket computer)
- Color BASIC and Disk Extended Color BASIC (TRS-80 Color Computer and Dragon 32/64)
- Commodore BASIC (Commodore 8-bit family, including the C64)
- FreeBASIC – a free implementation inspired by QuickBASIC
- Galaksija BASIC (Galaksija home computer)
- Gambas – free implementation inspired by Visual Basic
- GW-BASIC (BASICA for MS-DOS, on PC compatibles)
- HP2640 HP2647 Programmable Terminal with AGL graphics extensions
- IBM Cassette BASIC (Original IBM PC, built into ROM)
- Microsoft Level III BASIC (Tandy/Radio-Shack TRS-80)
- MBASIC (CP/M, on 8080, 8085, and Z80-based computers)
- MS BASIC for Macintosh (Mac OS on Apple Macintosh)
- MSX BASIC (MSX standard home computers)
- N88-BASIC (NEC PC8801/9801)
- N82-BASIC (NEC PC-8201/8201A, TRS-80 Model 100)
- Oric Extended Basic (Oric 8-bit family)
- QBasic (PC DOS/MS-DOS on IBM PC and compatibles)
- QuickBASIC (PC MS-DOS on IBM PC and compatibles)
- QB64 – a free clone of QBasic
- Small Basic (MS Windows on IBM PC and compatibles)
- T-BASIC (Toshiba Pasopia) and T-BASIC7 (Toshiba Pasopia 7)
- TRS-80 Level II BASIC (Tandy/Radio-Shack TRS-80)
- Visual Basic (classic and .NET) (PC DOS/MS-DOS/MS Windows on IBM PC and compatibles)
- Video Technology Basic (Laser 350/500/700)
- WordBasic (pre-VBA) (MS Windows)

== See also ==
- Atari BASIC
- BBC BASIC
- Integer BASIC
- Locomotive BASIC
- An Open Letter to Hobbyists
- Tiny BASIC
