= Monte Davidoff =

American computer programmer (b. 1956)

- Born: 1956 (age 69–70)
- Education: Harvard College
- Occupations: Businessman; computer programmer
- Known for: Floating-point arithmetic routines for Altair BASIC; Mathematical routines in Microsoft BASIC

Monte Davidoff (/ˈmɒnti ˈdeɪvɪdɒf/; born 1956) is an American computer programmer who was one of the first employees of Microsoft.

Davidoff is from Glendale, Wisconsin. He graduated from Nicolet High School in 1974. As a high-school student, he developed a deep interest in computers and taught himself to code in different languages and for different computers. He subsequently attended Harvard College, majoring in mathematics. At that time, Harvard did not have a separate program for computer science; students interested in this subject typically majored in (applied) mathematics, physics, or engineering. Davidoff also worked at WHRB, the college radio station, and graduated from Harvard in 1978.

Davidoff was a schoolmate of Bill Gates at Harvard. Gates and his business partner, Paul Allen, met Davidoff while discussing how to write a floating-point algorithm. Impressed with his technical knowledge and experience, Gates and Allen recruited Davidoff, then a freshman, for their new company Micro-Soft. (The hyphen was dropped in 1976.) Davidoff was assigned the task of writing floating-point arithmetic routines for Altair BASIC over the summer, when the three of them lived in Albuquerque, New Mexico, where their company was then headquartered. Gates, Allen, and Davidoff managed to write the software without ever seeing the Altair 8800 thanks to a simulator. They also spent time at Harvard's Aiken Computation Laboratory coding on the PDP-10 using Gates' account. Their unusually high usage time was spotted by an administrator, who was concerned that it would jeopardize the school's federal funding following an audit. Gates was later admonished for allowing entry to unauthorized individuals, but Davidoff was cleared of any wrongdoing. They finished this project in 1977. Davidoff was responsible for the mathematical routines. These routines were subsequently reused in Microsoft BASIC products for other systems. The source code is now available at the Pusey Library of Harvard University.

Davidoff returned to Harvard to finish his degree. He later worked at Honeywell Information Systems on the Multics project, Tandem Computers, Ready Systems, and Stratus Computer. Since 2000, he has been working as a consultant through his own company, Alluvial Software, in Cupertino, California. Although he facilitated the rise of Microsoft, he later became a Linux user. His favorite programming language is Python.

== See also ==
- BASIC
- Microsoft Binary Format
