= Altair 8800 =

Microcomputer designed in 1974

MITS Altair 8800
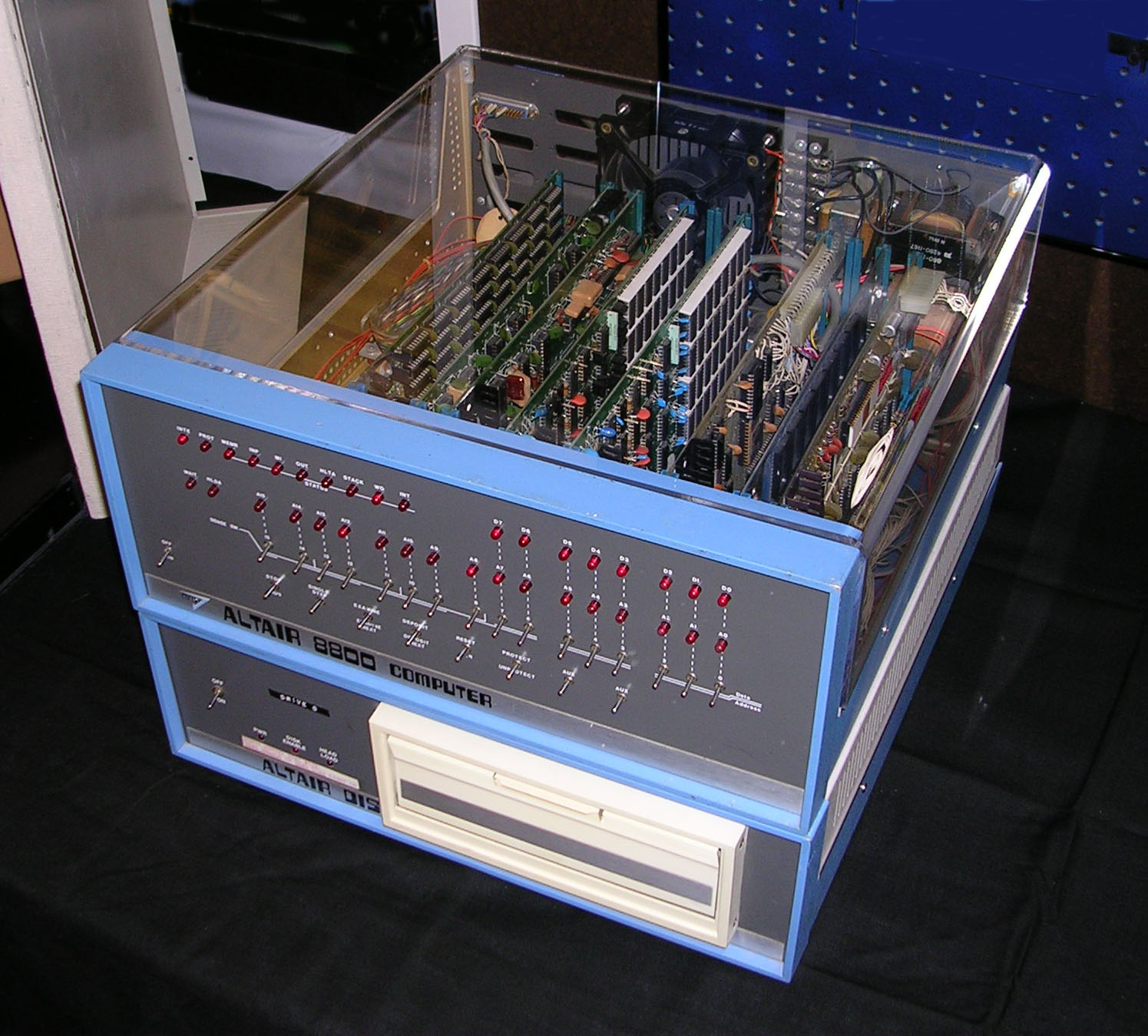
- Altair 8800 Computer with 8-inch floppy disk system
- Developer: Micro Instrumentation and Telemetry Systems
- Released: December 19, 1974; 51 years ago
- Introductory price: Kit: US$439 (equivalent to $2,627 in 2025); Assembled: US$621 (equivalent to $3,716 in 2025)
- Units sold: 25,000
- CPU: Intel 8080 @ 2 MHz

The Altair 8800 is a microcomputer introduced in 1974 by Micro Instrumentation and Telemetry Systems (MITS) based on the Intel 8080 CPU. It was the first commercially successful personal computer. Interest in the Altair 8800 grew quickly after it was featured on the cover of the January 1975 issue of Popular Electronics. It was sold by mail order through advertisements in Popular Electronics, Radio-Electronics, and in other hobbyist magazines. The Altair 8800 had no built-in screen or video output, so it would have to be connected to a serial terminal or teletype to have any output. To connect it to a terminal, a serial interface card had to be installed. Alternatively, the Altair could be programmed using its front-panel switches.

According to the personal computer pioneer Harry Garland, the Altair 8800 was the product that catalyzed the microcomputer revolution of the 1970s. The computer bus designed for the Altair became a de facto standard in the form of the S-100 bus, and the first programming language for the machine was Microsoft's founding product, Altair BASIC.

== History ==
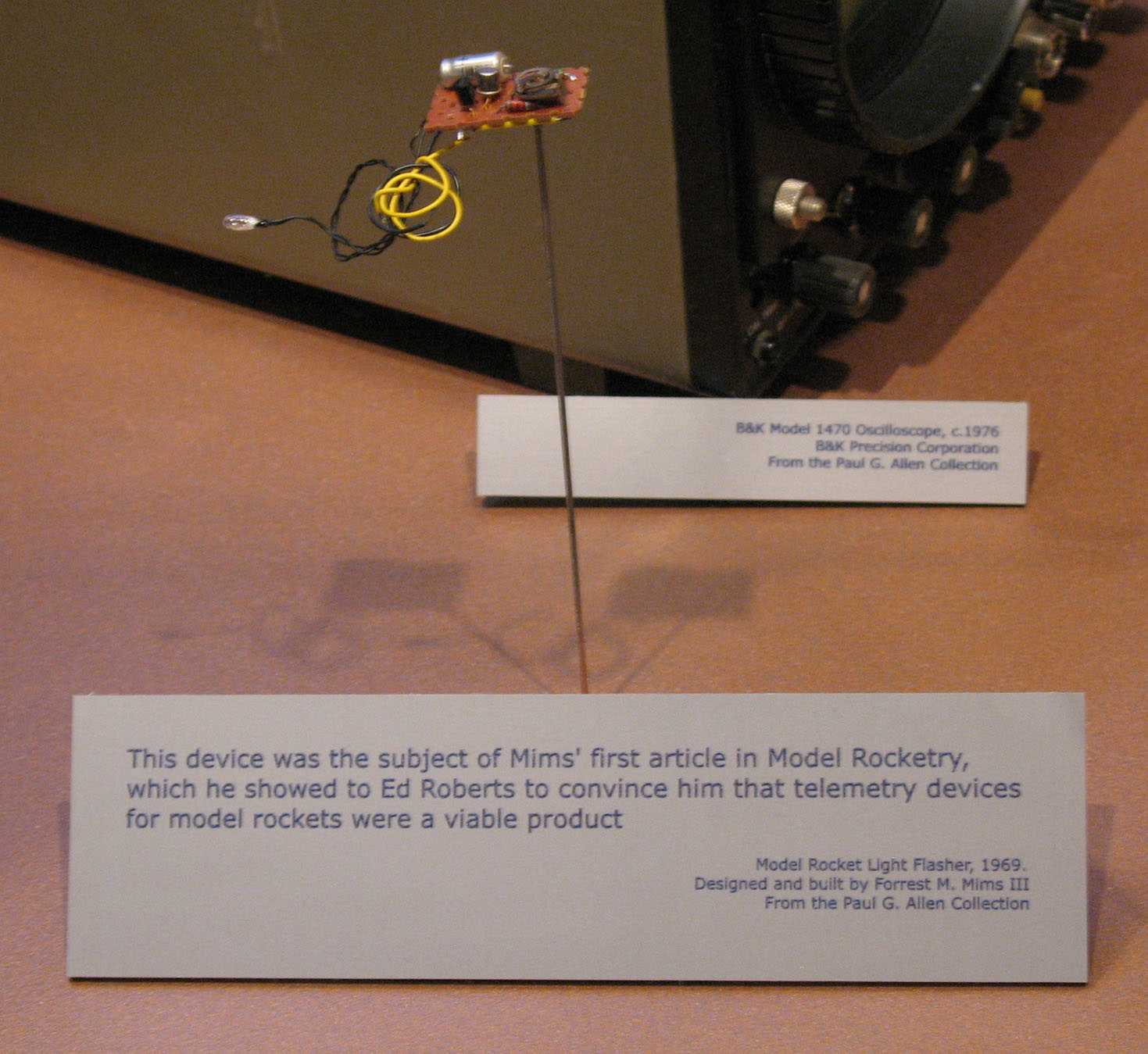
This "Tracking Light for Model Rockets" project appeared in the September 1969 issue of Model Rocketry and was the first kit sold by MITS.

While serving at the Air Force Weapons Laboratory at Kirtland Air Force Base in Albuquerque, New Mexico, Ed Roberts and Forrest M. Mims III decided to use their electronics background to produce small kits for model rocket hobbyists. In 1969, Roberts and Mims, along with Stan Cagle and Robert Zaller, founded Micro Instrumentation and Telemetry Systems (MITS) in Roberts' garage in Albuquerque, New Mexico, and started selling radio transmitters and instruments for model rockets.

=== Calculators ===
The model rocket kits were a modest success and MITS wanted to try a kit that would appeal to more hobbyists. The November 1970 issue of Popular Electronics featured the Opticom, a kit from MITS that would send voice over an LED light beam. As Mims and Cagle were losing interest in the kit business, Roberts bought his partners out and began developing a calculator kit. Electronic Arrays had just announced the EAS100, a set of six large scale integrated (LSI) circuit chips that would make a four-function calculator. The MITS 816 calculator kit used the chipset and was featured on the November 1971 cover of Popular Electronics. This calculator kit sold for $175, or $275 assembled. The calculator uses "electro-luminescent" tubes for its display. Forrest Mims wrote the assembly manual for this kit and many others over the next several years. As payment for each manual he often accepted a copy of the kit.

The calculator was successful and was followed by several improved models. The MITS 1440 calculator was featured in the July 1973 issues of Radio-Electronics. It had a 14-digit display, memory, and square root function. The kit sold for $200 and the assembled version was $250. MITS later developed a programmer unit that would connect to the 816 or 1440 calculator and allow programs of up to 256 steps.

In 1972, Texas Instruments developed its own calculator chip and started selling complete calculators at less than half the price of other commercial models. MITS and many other companies were devastated by this, and Roberts struggled to reduce his quarter-million-dollar debt.

=== Test equipment ===
In addition to calculators, MITS made a line of test equipment kits. These included an IC tester, a waveform generator, a digital voltmeter, and several other instruments. To keep up with the demand, MITS moved into a larger building at 6328 Linn NE in Albuquerque in 1973. They installed a wave soldering machine and an assembly line at the new location.

=== Popular Electronics ===
January 1975 Popular Electronics with the Altair 8800 computer. This issue was released to newsstands on December 19, 1974, a week before Christmas.

In January 1972, Popular Electronics merged with another Ziff-Davis magazine, Electronics World. The change in editorial staff upset many of their authors, and they started writing for a competing magazine, Radio-Electronics. In 1972 and 1973, some of the best construction projects appeared in Radio-Electronics.

In 1974, Art Salsberg became editor of Popular Electronics. It was Salsberg's goal to reclaim the lead in electronics projects. He was impressed with Don Lancaster's TV Typewriter (Radio Electronics, September 1973) article and wanted computer projects for Popular Electronics. Don Lancaster did an ASCII keyboard for Popular Electronics in April 1974. They were evaluating a computer trainer project by Jerry Ogden when the Mark-8 8008-based computer by Jonathan Titus appeared on the July 1974 cover of Radio-Electronics. The computer trainer was put on hold and the editors looked for a real computer system. (Popular Electronics gave Jerry Ogden a column, Computer Bits, starting in June 1975.)

One of the editors, Les Solomon, knew MITS was working on an Intel 8080 based computer project and thought Roberts could provide the project for the always popular January issue. In a last-ditch attempt to save MITS, Roberts decided to do something that was impossible at the time: create a personal computer kit for hobbyists. The TV Typewriter and the Mark-8 computer projects were just a detailed set of plans and a set of bare printed circuit boards. The hobbyist faced the daunting task of acquiring all of the integrated circuits and other components. The editors of Popular Electronics wanted a complete kit in a professional-looking enclosure.

Ed Roberts and his head engineer, Bill Yates, finished the first prototype in October 1974 and shipped it to Popular Electronics in New York via the Railway Express Agency. However, it never arrived due to a strike by the shipping company. Solomon already had a number of pictures of the machine and the article was based on them. Roberts got to work on building a replacement. The computer on the magazine cover is an empty box with just switches and LEDs on the front panel. The finished Altair computer had a completely different circuit board layout than the prototype shown in the magazine. The January 1975 issue was registered on November 29, 1974, and began appearing on newsstands on December 19, 1974—during the week before Christmas of 1974—at which point the kit was officially (if not yet practically) available for sale.

=== The name ===
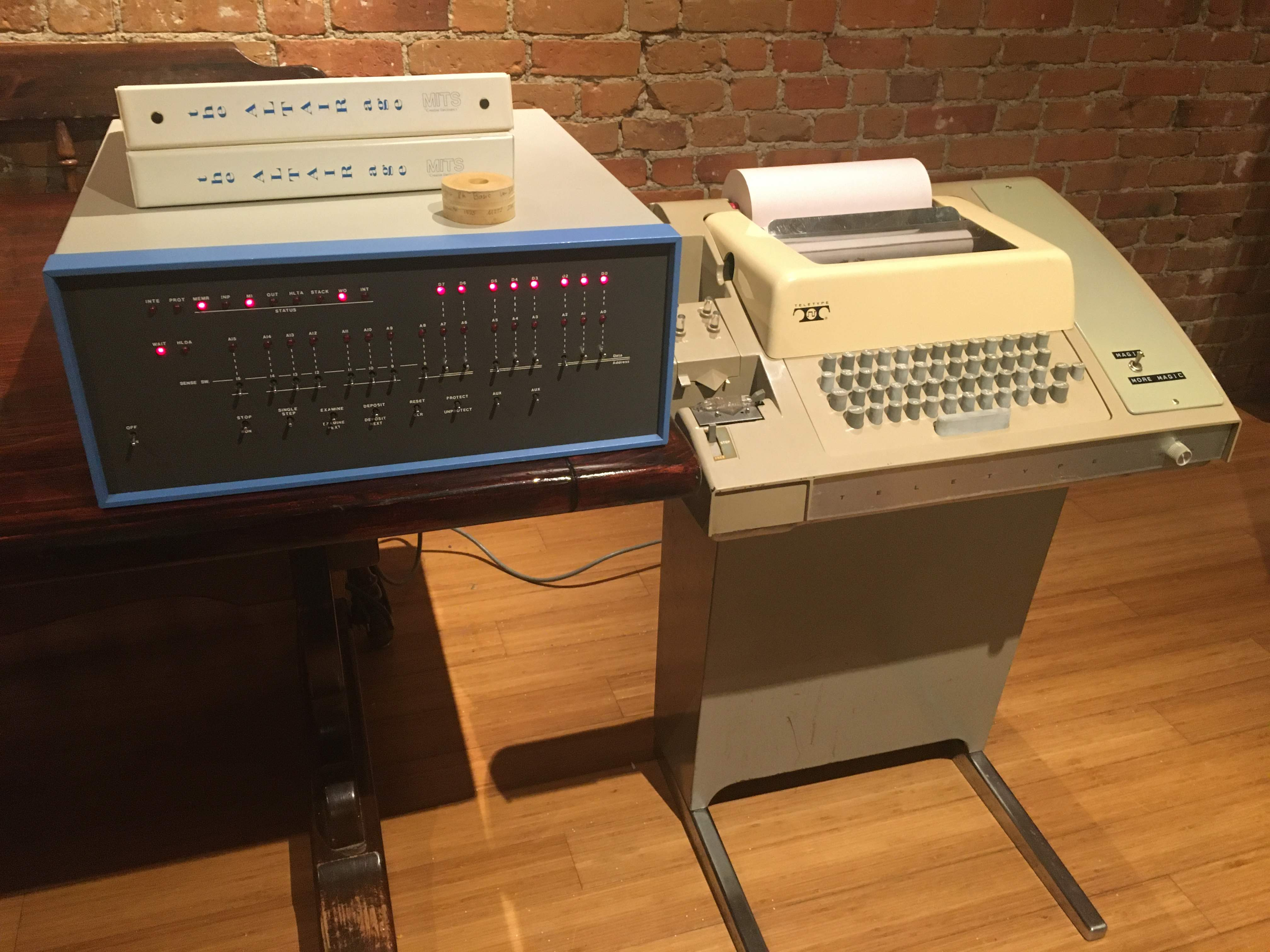
A kit-built Altair 8800 computer with the popular Model 33 ASR (Automatic Send and Receive) Teletype as terminal

The typical MITS product had a generic name like the "Model 1440 Calculator" or the "Model 1600 Digital Voltmeter". Ed Roberts was busy finishing the design and left the naming of the computer to the editors of Popular Electronics.

One explanation of the Altair name, which editor Les Solomon later told the audience at the first Altair Computer Convention (March 1976), is that the name was inspired by Les's 12-year-old daughter, Lauren. "She said why don't you call it Altair – that's where the Enterprise is going tonight." The Star Trek episode is probably "Amok Time", as this is the only one from The Original Series which takes the Enterprise crew to Altair (Six).

Another explanation is that the Altair was originally going to be named the PE-8 (Popular Electronics 8-bit), but Les Solomon thought this name to be rather dull, so Les, Alexander Burawa (associate editor), and John McVeigh (technical editor) decided that: "It's a stellar event, so let's name it after a star." McVeigh suggested "Altair", the twelfth brightest star in the sky.

=== Intel 8080 ===
Ed Roberts had designed and manufactured programmable calculators and was familiar with the microprocessors available in 1974. He thought the Intel 4004 and Intel 8008 were not powerful enough (in fact several microcomputers based on Intel chips were already on the market: the Canadian company Microsystems International's CPS-1 built-in 1972 used a MIL MF7114 chip modeled on the 4004, the Micral marketed in January 1973 by the French company R2E and the MCM/70 marketed in 1974 by the Canadian company Micro Computer Machines); the National Semiconductor IMP-8 and IMP-16 required external hardware; the Motorola 6800 was still in development. So he chose the 8-bit Intel 8080. At that time, Intel's main business was selling memory chips by the thousands to computer companies. They had no experience in selling small quantities of microprocessors. When the 8080 was introduced in April 1974, Intel set the single unit price at $360 ($2350 in 2025). "That figure had a nice ring to it," recalled Intel's Dave House in 1984. "Besides, it was a computer, and they usually cost thousands of dollars, so we felt it was a reasonable price." Ed Roberts had experience in buying OEM quantities of calculator chips and he was able to negotiate a $75 price ($490 in 2025) for the 8080 microprocessor chips. Seizing the opportunity to be ahead of computers of the time, MITS began development of the Altair 8800 in the summer of 1974, about 2 months after the release of the Intel 8080.

Intel made the Intellec-8 Microprocessor Development System that typically sold for a very profitable $10,000. It was functionally similar to the Altair 8800 but it was a commercial grade system with a wide selection of peripherals and development software. Customers would ask Intel why their Intellec-8 was so expensive when that Altair was only $400. Some Intel salesmen told their customers that MITS was getting cosmetic rejects or otherwise inferior chips. In July 1975, Intel sent a letter to its sales force stating that the MITS Altair 8800 computer used standard Intel 8080 parts. The sales force should sell the Intellec system based on its merits and that no one should make derogatory comments about valued customers like MITS. The letter was reprinted in the August 1975 issue of MITS Computer Notes. The "cosmetic defect" rumor has appeared in many accounts over the years although both MITS and Intel issued written denials in 1975.

=== The launch ===
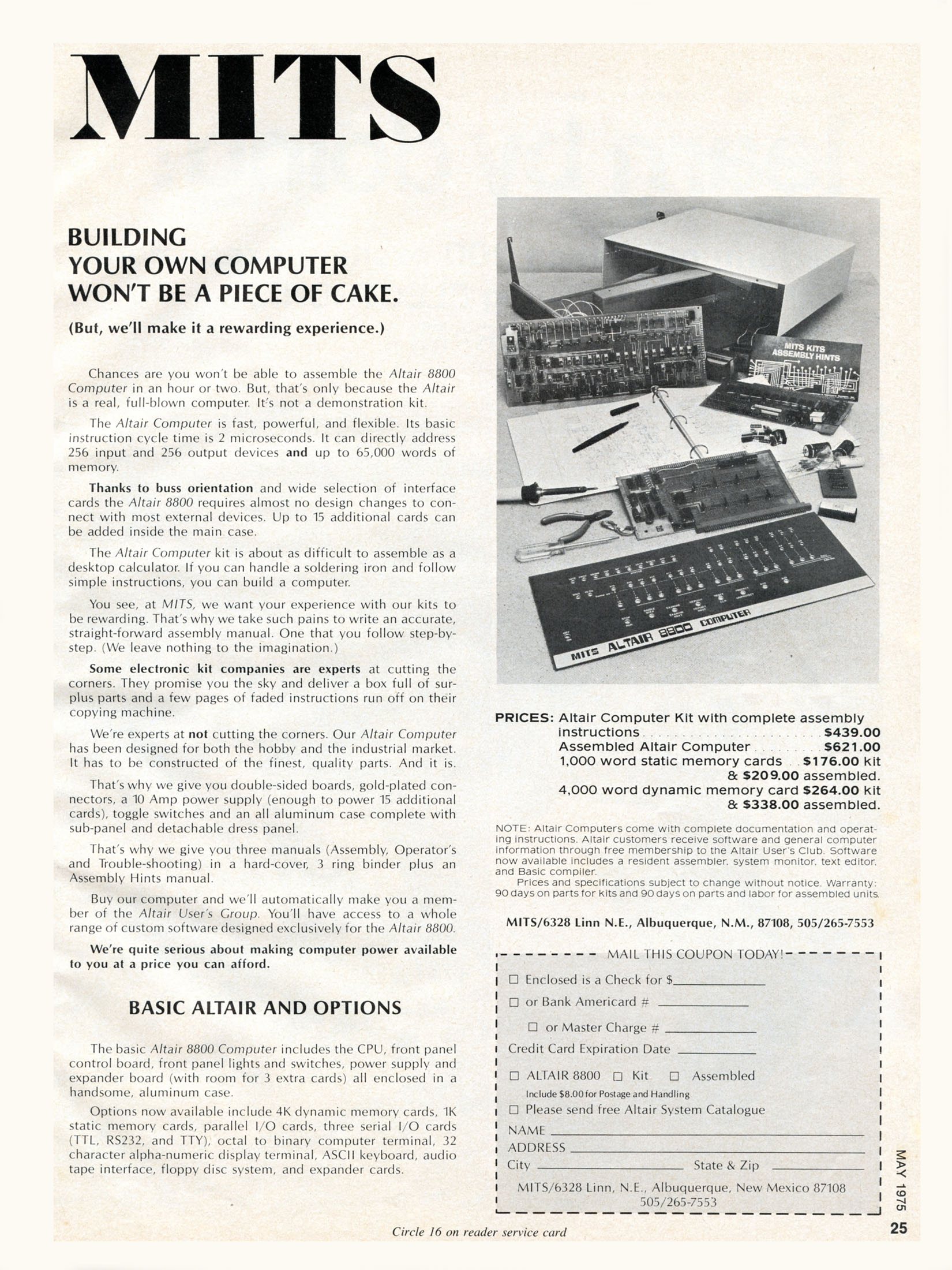
A May 1975 advertisement for the Altair 8800 Computer appeared in Popular Electronics, Radio-Electronics, and other magazines.

For a decade, colleges had required science and engineering majors to take a course in computer programming, typically using the FORTRAN or BASIC languages. This meant there was a sizable customer base who knew about computers. In 1970, electronic calculators were not seen outside of a laboratory, but by 1974 they were a common household item. Calculators and video games like Pong introduced computer power to the general public. Electronics hobbyists were moving on to digital projects such as digital voltmeters and frequency counters. The Altair had enough power to be actually useful, and was designed as an expandable system that opened it up to all sorts of applications.

Ed Roberts optimistically told his banker that he could sell 800 computers, while in reality they needed to sell 200 over the next year just to break even. When readers got the January issue of Popular Electronics, MITS was flooded with inquiries and orders. They had to hire extra people just to answer the phones. In February MITS received 1,000 orders for the Altair 8800. The quoted delivery time was 60 days but it was months before they could meet that. Roberts focused on delivering the computer; all of the options would wait until they could keep pace with the orders. MITS claimed to have delivered 2,500 Altair 8800s by the end of May. The number was over 5,000 by August 1975. MITS had under 20 employees in January but had grown to 90 by October 1975.

The Altair 8800 computer was a break-even sale for MITS. They needed to sell additional memory boards, I/O boards and other options to make a profit. The system came with a "1024 word" (1024 byte) memory board populated with 256 bytes. The BASIC language was announced in July 1975 and required a serial interface board and at least one or two 4096 word memory boards, depending on the language variant.

MITS Price List, Popular Electronics, August 1975.

| Description | Kit price | Assembled |
|---|---|---|
| Altair 8800 Computer | $439 | $621 |
| 1024-word Memory Board | $176 | $209 |
| 4096-word Memory Board | $264 | $338 |
| Parallel Interface Board | $92 | $114 |
| Serial Interface Board (RS-232) | $119 | $138 |
| Serial Interface Board (Teletype) | $124 | $146 |
| Audio Cassette Interface Board | $128 | $174 |
| Teletype Model 33 ASR | —N/a | $1,500 |

- 4K BASIC language (when purchased with Altair, 4096 words of memory and interface board): $60
- 8K BASIC language (when purchased with Altair, two 4096-word memory boards and interface board): $75

MITS had no competition in the US for the first half of 1975. Their 4K memory board used dynamic RAM and it had several problems that stemmed from imperfect design or imperfect chips (the official company line). The delay in shipping optional boards and the problems with the 4K memory board created an opportunity for outside suppliers.

An enterprising Altair owner, Robert Marsh, designed a 4K static memory that was plug-in compatible with the Altair 8800 and sold for $255. His company was Processor Technology, one of the most successful Altair compatible board suppliers. Their advertisement in the July 1975 issue of Popular Electronics promised interface and PROM boards in addition to the 4K memory board. They would later develop a popular video display board that would plug directly into the Altair.

A consulting company in San Leandro, California, IMS Associates, Inc., wanted to purchase several Altair computers, but the long delivery time convinced them that they should build their own computers. In the October 1975 issue of Popular Electronics, a small advertisement announced the IMSAI 8080 computer. The ad noted that all boards were "plug compatible" with the Altair 8800. The computer cost $439 as a kit. The first 50 IMSAI computers shipped in December 1975. The IMSAI 8080 computer improved on the original Altair design in several areas. It was easier to assemble: The Altair required 60 wire connections between the front panel and the motherboard (backplane). The IMSAI required only two soldered connections between the front panel and power supply. The MITS motherboard consisted a four slot segment that had to be connected to other segments with 100 wires to make a larger motherboard. The IMSAI motherboard implemented 22 slots on a single segment. The IMSAI replaced the Altair's one-shot clock generator with the Intel 8224. The IMSAI also had a larger power supply to handle the increasing number of expansion boards used in typical systems. The IMSAI advantage was short lived because MITS had recognized these shortcomings and developed the Altair 8800B, which was introduced in June 1976.

In 1977, Pertec Computer Corporation purchased MITS and began to market the computer, without changes (except for branding), as the PCC 8800 in 1978.

== Description ==
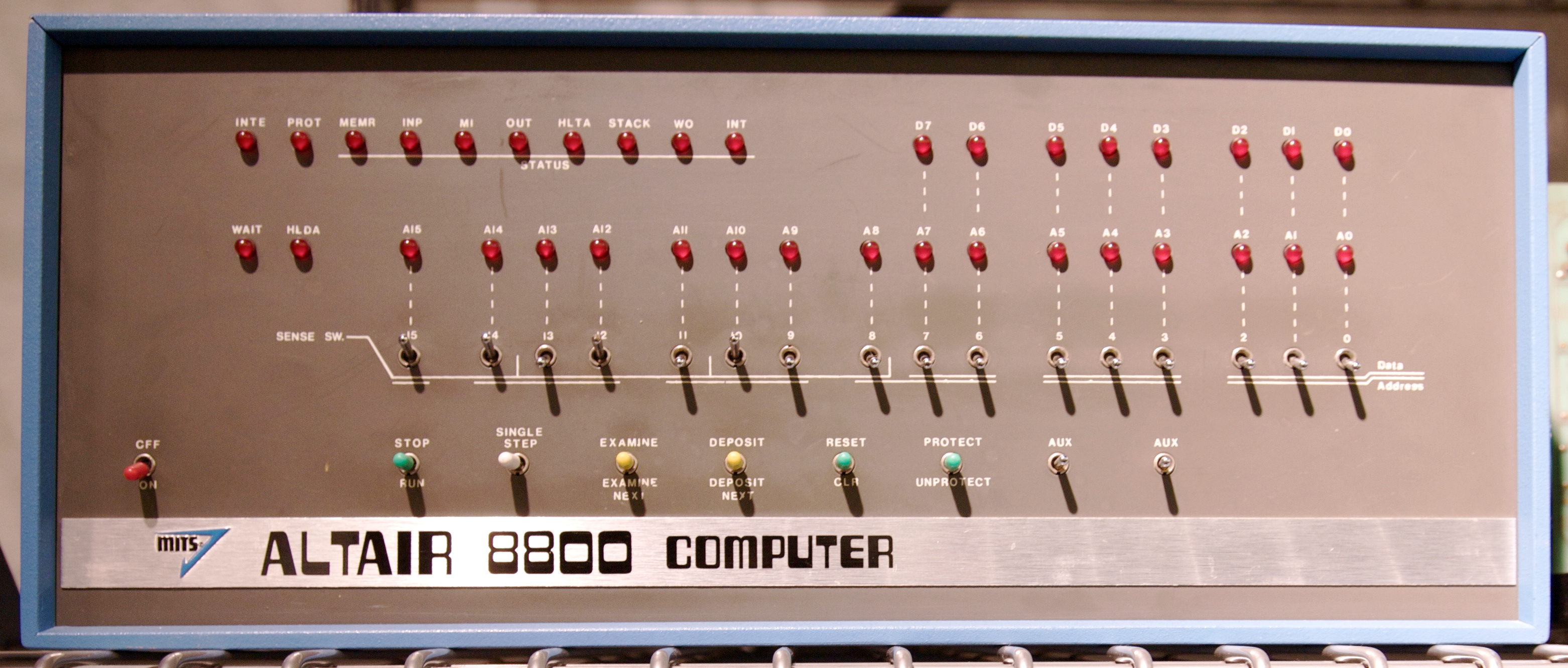
Altair 8800 front panel (1st model)

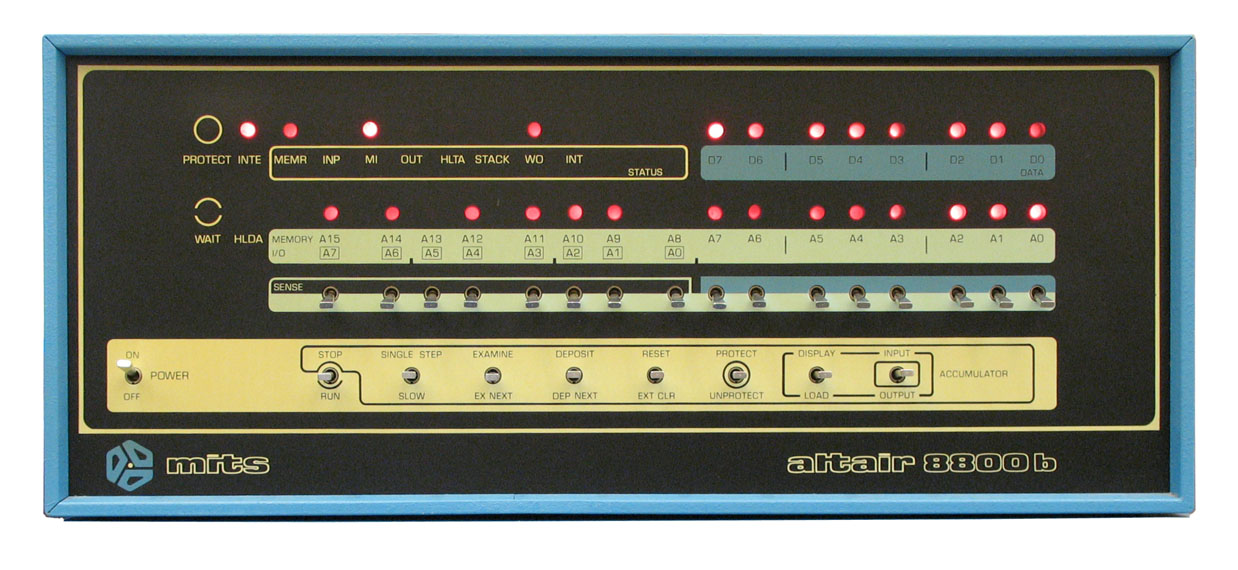
Altair 8800b front panel (2nd model)

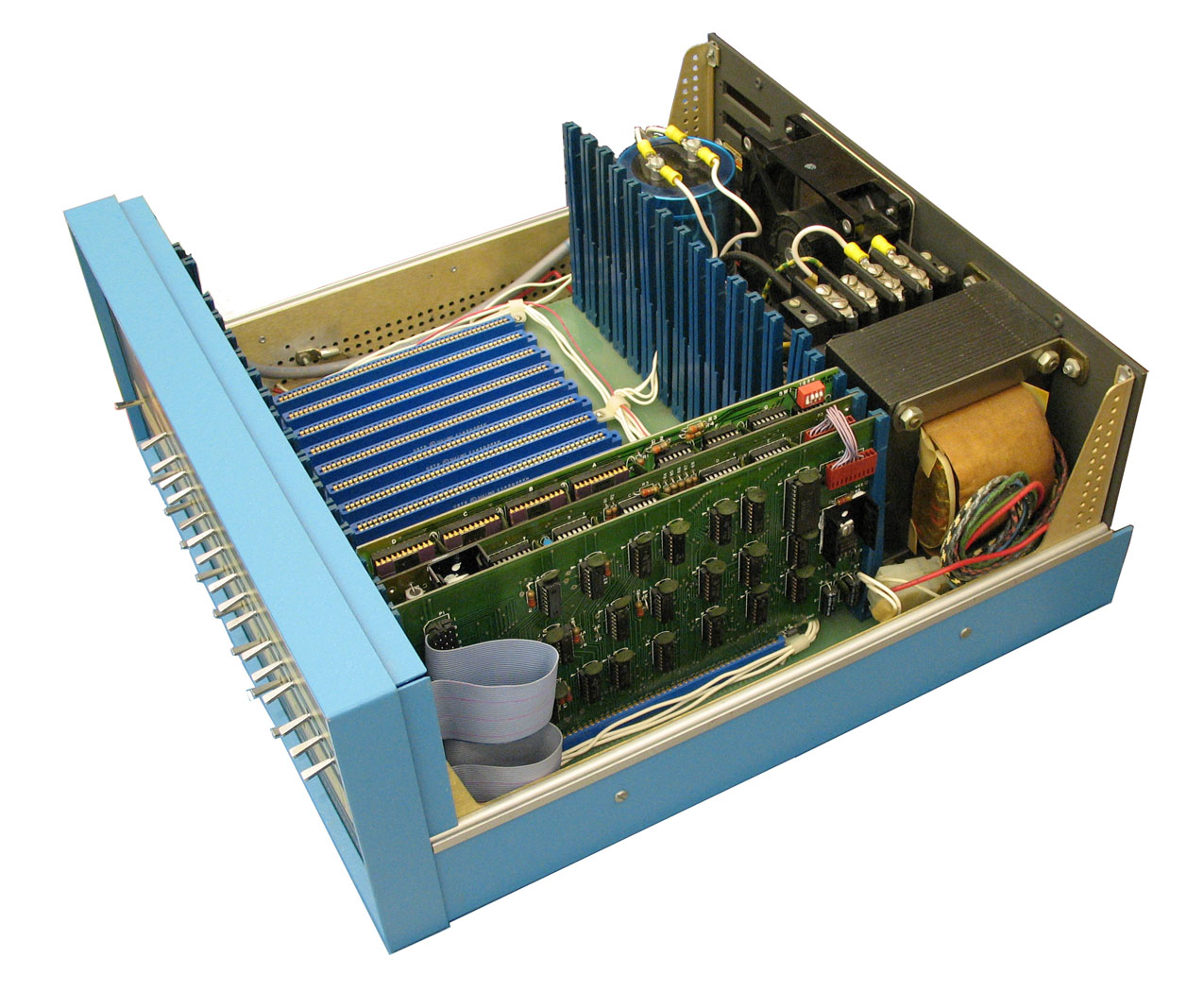
Inside the Altair 8800b (2nd model)

In the first design of the Altair, the parts needed to make a complete machine would not fit on a single motherboard, and the machine consisted of four boards stacked on top of each other with stand-offs. Another problem facing Roberts was that the parts needed to make a truly useful computer were not available, or would not be designed in time for the January launch date. So during the construction of the second model, he decided to build most of the machine on removable cards, reducing the motherboard to nothing more than an interconnect between the cards, a backplane. The basic machine consisted of five cards, including the CPU on one and memory on another. He then looked for a cheap source of connectors and came across a supply of 100-pin edge connectors. The S-100 bus was eventually acknowledged by the professional computer community and adopted as the IEEE-696 computer bus standard.

The Altair bus consists of the pins of the Intel 8080 run out onto the backplane. The bus design was not as well-thought-out as it might have been, which led to disasters such as shorting from various power lines of differing voltages being located next to each other. Another oddity was that the system included two unidirectional 8-bit data buses, when the normal practice was for a single bidirectional bus (this oddity did, however, allow a later expansion of the S-100 standard to 16 bits bidirectional by using both 8-bit buses in parallel). A deal on power supplies led to the use of +8 V and ±18 V, which had to be locally regulated on the cards to TTL (+5 V) or RS-232 (±12 V) standard voltage levels.

The Altair shipped in a two-piece case. The backplane and power supply were mounted on a base plate, along with the front and rear of the box. The "lid" was shaped like a C, forming the top, left, and right sides of the box. The front panel, which was inspired by the Data General Nova minicomputer, included a large number of toggle switches to feed binary data directly into the memory of the machine, and a number of red LEDs to read those values back out.

Programming the Altair via the front panel could be a tedious and time-consuming process. Programming required the toggling of the switches to positions corresponding to the desired 8080 microprocessor instruction or opcode in binary, then used the "DEPOSIT NEXT" switch to load that instruction into the next address of the machine's memory. This step was repeated until all the opcodes of a presumably complete and correct program were in place. The only output from the programs was the patterns of lights on the panel. Nevertheless, many were sold in this form. Development was already underway on additional cards, including a paper tape reader interface for storage, additional RAM cards, and an RS-232 interface to connect to a proper teletype terminal.

== Software ==
=== Altair BASIC ===
Ed Roberts received a letter from Traf-O-Data asking whether he would be interested in buying what would eventually be the BASIC programming language for the machine. He called the company and reached a private home, where no one had heard of anything like BASIC. In fact the letter had been sent by Bill Gates and Paul Allen from the Boston area, and they had no BASIC yet to offer. When they called Roberts to follow up on the letter he expressed his interest, and the two started work on their BASIC interpreter using a self-made simulator for the 8080 on a PDP-10 mainframe computer. They figured that they had 30 days before someone else beat them to the punch, and once they had a version working on the simulator, Allen flew to Albuquerque to deliver the program, Altair BASIC (aka MITS 4K BASIC), on a paper tape. The first time it was run, it displayed "READY", then Allen typed "PRINT 2+2", and it immediately printed the correct answer: "4". The game Lunar Lander was entered in, and this worked as well. Gates soon joined Allen and formed Microsoft, then spelled "Micro-Soft".

=== Altair DOS ===
Announced in late 1975, it started shipping in August 1977.

=== Games ===
The following table lists 14 documented commercial games available for the Altair 8800

| Title | Year | Publisher |
|---|---|---|
| Bridge 2.0 | 1979 | Dynacomp |
| Chase! | 1976 | Cromemco |
| Dazzler Tic Tac Toe | 1976 | Cromemco |
| Encounter! | 1977 | Objective Design |
| Flight Simulator | 1979 | Dynacomp |
| Four-Dimensional Tic Tac Toe | | Cromemco |
| Hearts 1.5 | 1979 | Dynacomp |
| Microchess | 1977 | Micro-Ware |
| Spacewar | 1976 | Cromemco |
| Tankwar / Tank War | | Cromemco |
| Track | 1976 | Cromemco |
| Trek-80 | 1976 | Processor Technology |
| Valdez | 1979 | Dynacomp |
| Video Checkers | 1978 | Compu-Quote |

== See also ==
- SIMH emulates Altair 8800 with both 8080 and Z80.
- IMSAI 8080
