= Model Rocketry (magazine) =

- September 1969 issue of Model Rocketry.
- Managing Editor: Gordon Mandell
- Categories: Hobby magazines
- Frequency: Monthly
- Circulation: 15,000
- Publisher: George Flynn
- First issue: October 1968
- Final issue Number: February 1972; Vol. 4 No. 4
- Company: Model Rocketry, Inc.
- Country: US
- Based in: Cambridge, Massachusetts
- Language: English

Model Rocketry was an American hobbyist magazine published from October 1968 to February 1972. The Editor and Publisher was George J. Flynn and the Managing Editor was Gordon K. Mandell. Other members of the editorial and business staffs, some of whom held several positions at various times during the years the magazine was published, were Assistant Editors Robert B. Singer (November 1969 to November 1971) and Robert Parks (July 1970 to February 1972); Technical Editor Douglas J. Malewicki (November 1969 to February 1972); Business Managers George J. Caporaso (October 1968 to August 1969), Jerome Apt, III (Jay Apt) (September 1969 to December 1970), Thomas T. Milkie (January to November 1971), and Arthur H. (Trip) Barber (December 1971 to February 1972); Technical Correspondent George J. Caporaso (September 1969 to February 1972); Distribution Managers Thomas T. Milkie (October 1968 to October 1969), Kevin P. Brown (November 1969 to December 1970), and Steven Glines (January 1971 to February 1972); and Art Director Thomas T. Milkie (November and December 1969). The magazine was published by Model Rocketry, Inc., a closely held corporation owned by founding staff members George J. Flynn, Gordon K. Mandell, George J. Caporaso, and Thomas T. Milkie and members of their families. Its paid circulation reached 15,000 by 1970.

The launch of Sputnik in 1957 and the space race to the Moon made model rocketry a popular hobby. Model Rocketry magazine was started at the height of the Apollo program. Each issue had plans and instructions for constructing rockets typically powered by black powder rocket motors such as those made by Estes Industries. There were also technical articles on model rocket design that would include several pages of theory and equations. There was a series of articles starting in October 1969 on writing FORTRAN programs to calculate flight parameters. The magazine also covered model rocketry clubs' launch meets and contests.

From August 1969 to February 1972 Model Rocketry incorporated The Model Rocketeer, the official journal of the National Association of Rocketry.

The September 1969 issue of Model Rocketry shown at the right has a typical cover design and contents. The cover photo shows the launch of a model rocket approximately 2 feet (61 cm) tall with a small camera as the payload. The camera will take a photo after the rocket reaches its apogee and starts its descent with a parachute. This issue also has construction plans for an egg lofting rocket, a type of rocket used in competitions to see how high an egg could be launched and recovered without cracking. The topics on the cover include Apollo 11 and the issue includes a six-page article by the Managing Editor, Gordon Mandell, about the first human mission to land on the Moon.

== Micro Instrumentation and Telemetry Systems ==
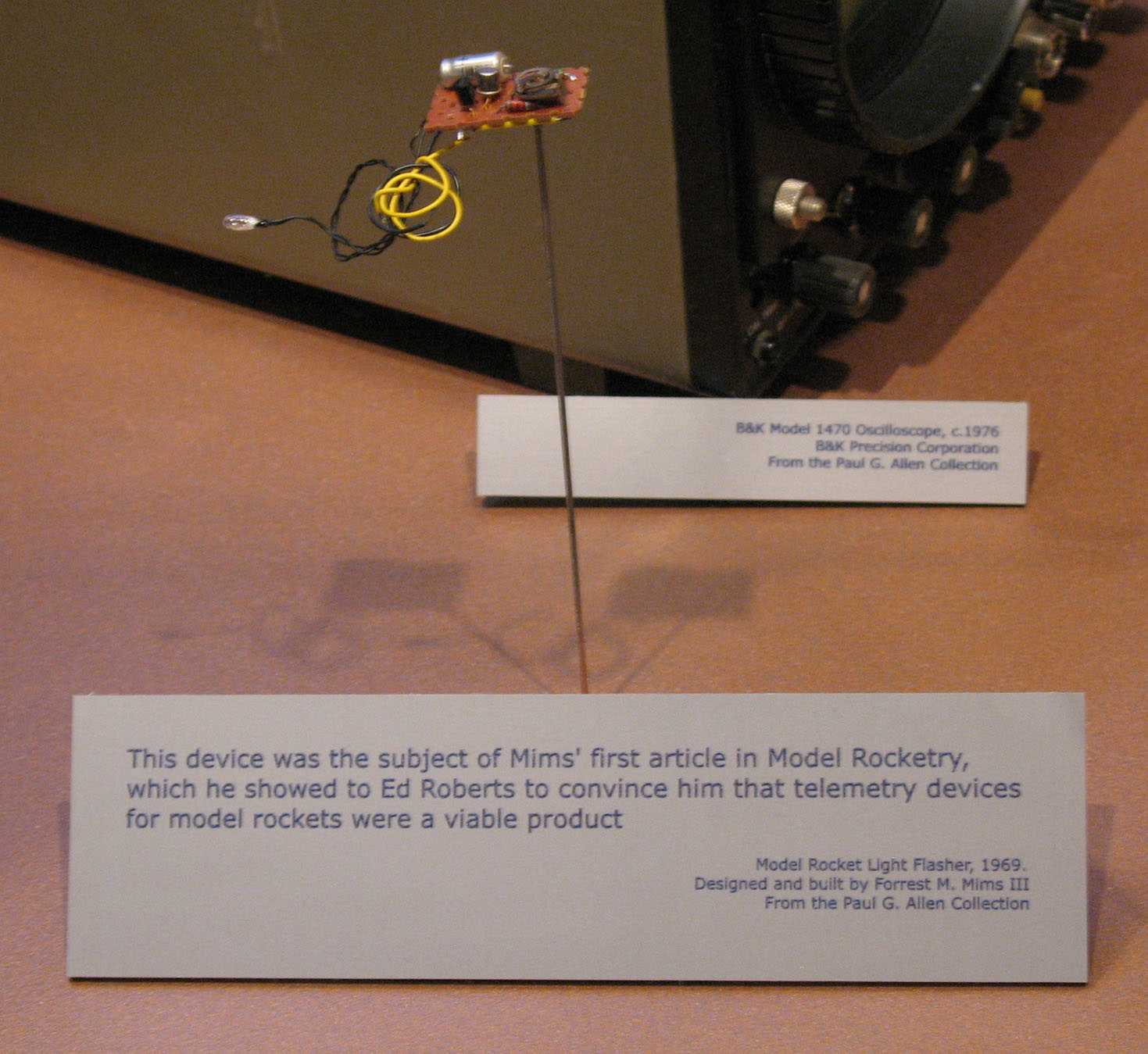
Transistorized Tracking Light.

In July 1969, Publisher George Flynn attended the Southwestern Model Rocket Conference at Eastern New Mexico University. There he met Air Force Captain Forrest Mims, senior advisor to the Albuquerque Model Rocket Club. Mims told Flynn about a transistorized lamp flasher for tracking night launched rockets. He also described modulating Light Emitting Diodes to transmit data from the rocket to infrared detectors on the ground. Flynn invited Mims to write an article about his "Transistorized Tracking Light for Night Launched Model Rockets" and it was published in the September 1969 issue of Model Rocketry.

Mims was stationed at Kirtland Air Force Base in Albuquerque NM with a fellow officer, Ed Roberts. They decided to form a company to sell electronic kits for projects like the tracking light. Mims, Roberts and two other coworkers formed Micro Instrumentation and Telemetry Systems (MITS) in late 1969. The press release announcing the formation of MITS was published in the December 1969 issue of Model Rocketry. In January 1975 MITS introduced the Altair 8800 computer and the personal computer revolution was launched. Bill Gates and Paul Allen moved to Albuquerque in 1975 to write Altair BASIC and soon started Microsoft.

Several copies of Model Rocketry magazine and the prototype tracking light are on display at the New Mexico Museum of Natural History and Science in their "STARTUP: Albuquerque and the Personal Computer Revolution" exhibit. Mr. Mims donated his MITS 816 calculator, Altair 8800 computer, early MITS documents and unsold model rocket telemetry kits to the Smithsonian National Museum of American History.
