= Glenn Hauser =

American broadcaster (born 1945)

- Born: April 12, 1945 (age 81); Berkeley, California
- Presenting career
- Show: World of Radio
- Show: Mundo Radial
- Country: United States
- Website: www.worldofradio.com

Glenn Hauser (born April 12, 1945) is an internationally known American DXer and radio host from Enid, Oklahoma. He produces and presents a weekly 30-minute program, World Of Radio, heard on a number of non-commercial AM and FM stations throughout the U.S. and worldwide on shortwave.

Hauser began his broadcasting career on Radio Canada International during the late 1970s, providing DX tips on Sunday nights, and his tips also appeared on Radio Nederland's DX Juke Box program. He wrote for Popular Electronics and Modern Electronics, and published Review of International Broadcasting.

== World of Radio ==
World Of Radio debuted in 1980 on WUOT in Knoxville, Tennessee, moving to shortwave two years later. The half-hour program consists of Hauser reading news about radio around the world in a characteristic monotone. Although World of Radio focuses on shortwave news, it covers all aspects of broadcasting. Most items are contributed by listeners to the program or DX publications.

=== Mundo Radial ===
Hauser also produced Mundo Radial, a Spanish edition of World of Radio, from January 2002 to November 2007.

== Review of International Broadcasting ==
Hauser introduced Review of International Broadcasting in February 1977. The magazine published 154 issues, with columns such as "Listener Insights on Programming," "Radio Equipment Forum," "DX Listening Digest," "The Media Mind" and "Satellite Watch." Contributors included David Newkirk, Loren Cox and Juan Carlos Codina, and RIB also featured columns from the BBC, John Norfolk and Alan Roe. It was published monthly during the 1970s and 1980s, later decreasing to quarterly and semiannually before ceasing publication in October 1997. RIB's successor, DX Listening Digest, went online in 1999.

== Political and religious views ==
Hauser is a USAF veteran, a political liberal and an agnostic, which occasionally puts him at odds with the fundamentalist-dominated American shortwave scene.
