= Ed Roberts (computer engineer) =

American engineer, entrepreneur and doctor

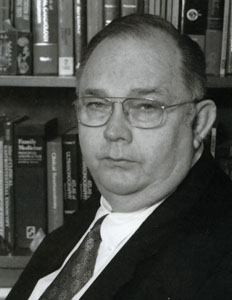
- Roberts in 2002
- Born: Henry Edward Roberts; September 13, 1941; Miami, Florida, U.S.
- Died: April 1, 2010 (aged 68); Cochran, Georgia, U.S.
- Education: University of Miami; Oklahoma State University; Mercer University
- Occupations: Electrical engineer Businessman; Entrepreneur; Farmer; Medical doctor
- Known for: Personal computer
- Spouses: Joan Clark (m. 1962; div. 1988) Donna Mauldin (m. 1991; div. 1999) Rosa Cooper (m. 2000)
- Children: 6

Henry Edward Roberts (September 13, 1941 – April 1, 2010) was an American engineer, entrepreneur and medical doctor who invented the first commercially successful microcomputer in 1974. He is most often known as "the father of the personal computer".

Roberts founded Micro Instrumentation and Telemetry Systems (MITS) in 1970 to sell electronics kits to model rocketry hobbyists, but the first successful product was an electronic calculator kit that was featured on the cover of the November 1971 issue of Popular Electronics. The calculators were very successful and sales topped one million dollars in 1973. A brutal calculator price war left the company deeply in debt by 1974. Roberts then developed the Altair 8800 personal computer that used the new Intel 8080 microprocessor. This was featured on the cover of the January 1975 issue of Popular Electronics, and hobbyists flooded MITS with orders for this $397 computer kit.

Bill Gates and Paul Allen joined MITS to develop software and Altair BASIC was Microsoft's first product. Roberts sold MITS in 1977 and retired to Georgia where he farmed, studied medicine and eventually became a small-town doctor living in Cochran, Georgia.

== Early life ==
Roberts was born on September 13, 1941, in Miami, Florida, to Henry Melvin Roberts, an appliance repairman, and Edna Wilcher Roberts, a registered nurse. His younger sister Cheryl was born in 1947. During World War II, while his father was in the Army, Roberts and his mother lived on the Wilcher family farm in Wheeler County, Georgia. After the war, the family returned to Miami, but Roberts would spend his summers with his grandparents in rural Georgia. Roberts's father had an appliance repair business in Miami.

Roberts became interested in electronics and built a small relay-based computer while in high school. Medicine was his true passion, however, and he entered the University of Miami with the intention of becoming a doctor, the first in his family to attend college. There he met a neurosurgeon who shared his interest in electronics. The doctor suggested that Roberts get an engineering degree before applying to medical school, and Roberts changed his major to electrical engineering.

Roberts married Joan Clark while at the university, and when she became pregnant Roberts knew that he would have to drop out of school to support his new family. The U.S. Air Force had a program that would pay for college, and in May 1962 he enlisted with the hope of finishing his degree through the Airman Education & Commissioning Program.

After basic training, Roberts attended the Cryptographic Equipment Maintenance School at Lackland Air Force Base in San Antonio, Texas. Because of his electrical engineering studies at college, Roberts was made an instructor at the Cryptographic School when he finished the course. To augment his meager enlisted man's pay, Roberts worked on several off-duty projects and even set up a one-man company, Reliance Engineering. The most notable job was to create the electronics that animated the Christmas characters in the window display of Joske's department store in San Antonio. In 1965, he was selected for an Air Force program to complete his college degree and become a commissioned officer. Roberts earned an electrical engineering degree from Oklahoma State University in 1968 and was assigned to the Laser Division of the Weapons Laboratory at Kirtland AFB in Albuquerque, New Mexico. In 1968, he looked into applying to medical school but learned that, at age 27, he was considered too old.

== Micro Instrumentation and Telemetry Systems ==
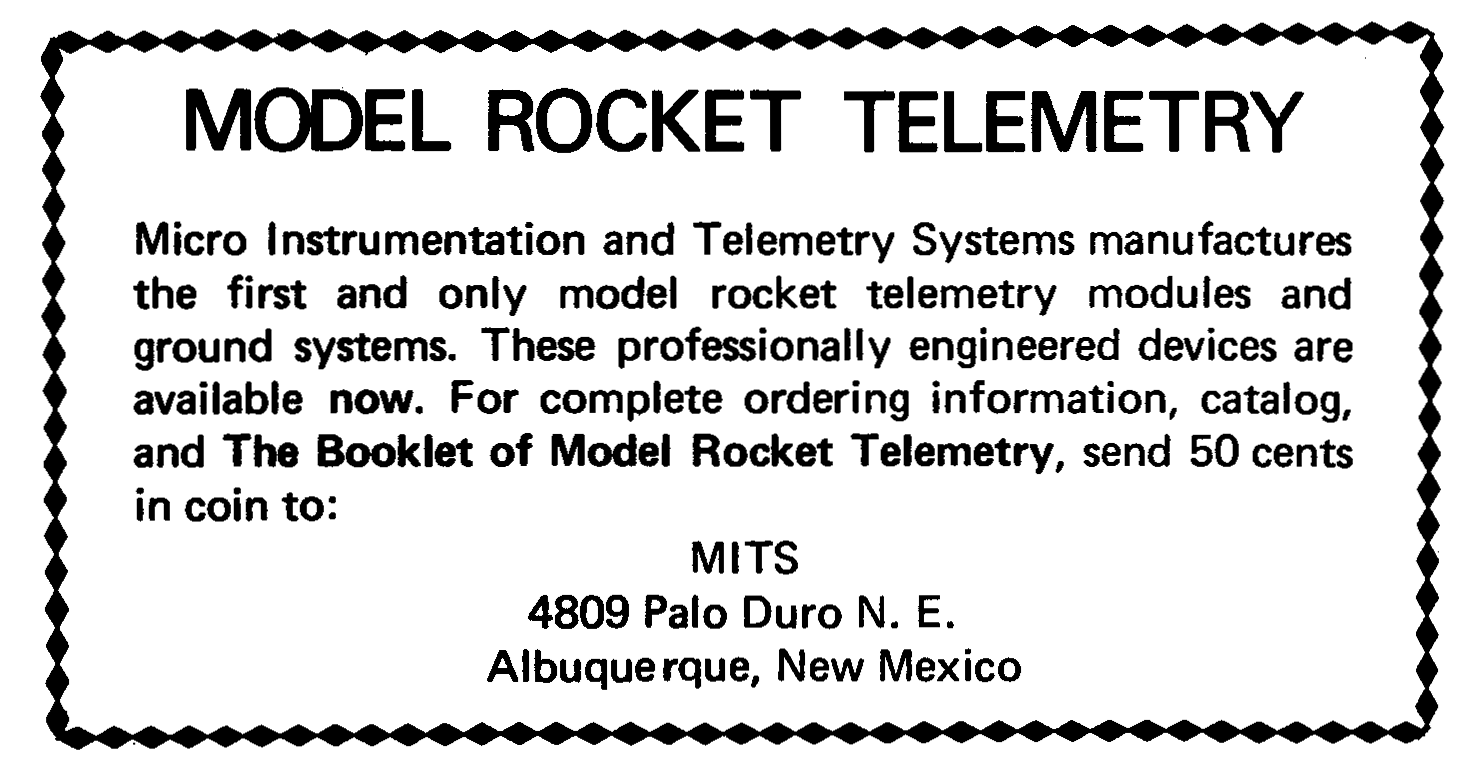
March 1970 advertisement, when MITS was located in Ed Roberts's garage.

Roberts worked with Forrest Mims at the Weapons Laboratory, and both shared an interest in model rocketry. Mims was an advisor to the Albuquerque Model Rocket Club and met the publisher of Model Rocketry magazine at a rocketry conference. This led to an article in the September 1969 issue of Model Rocketry, "Transistorized Tracking Light for Night Launched Model Rockets". Roberts, Mims, and lab coworkers Stan Cagle and Bob Zaller decided that they could design and sell electronics kits to model rocket hobbyists. Roberts wanted to call the new company Reliance Engineering, but Mims wanted to form an acronym similar to the Massachusetts Institute of Technology's MIT. Cagle came up with Micro Instrumentation and Telemetry Systems (MITS). They advertised the light flasher, a roll rate sensor with transmitter, and other kits in Model Rocketry, but the sales were disappointing.

Mims wrote an article about the new technology of light-emitting diodes that was to be published in the November 1970 issue of Popular Electronics magazine. He asked the editors if they also wanted a project story, and they agreed. Roberts and Mims developed an LED communicator that would transmit voice on an infrared beam of light to a receiver hundreds of feet away. Readers could buy a kit of parts to build the Opticom LED Communicator from MITS for $15. MITS sold just over a hundred kits. Mims was now out of the Air Force and wanted to pursue a career as a technology writer. Roberts bought out his original partners and focused the company on the emerging market of electronic calculators.

== Calculators ==
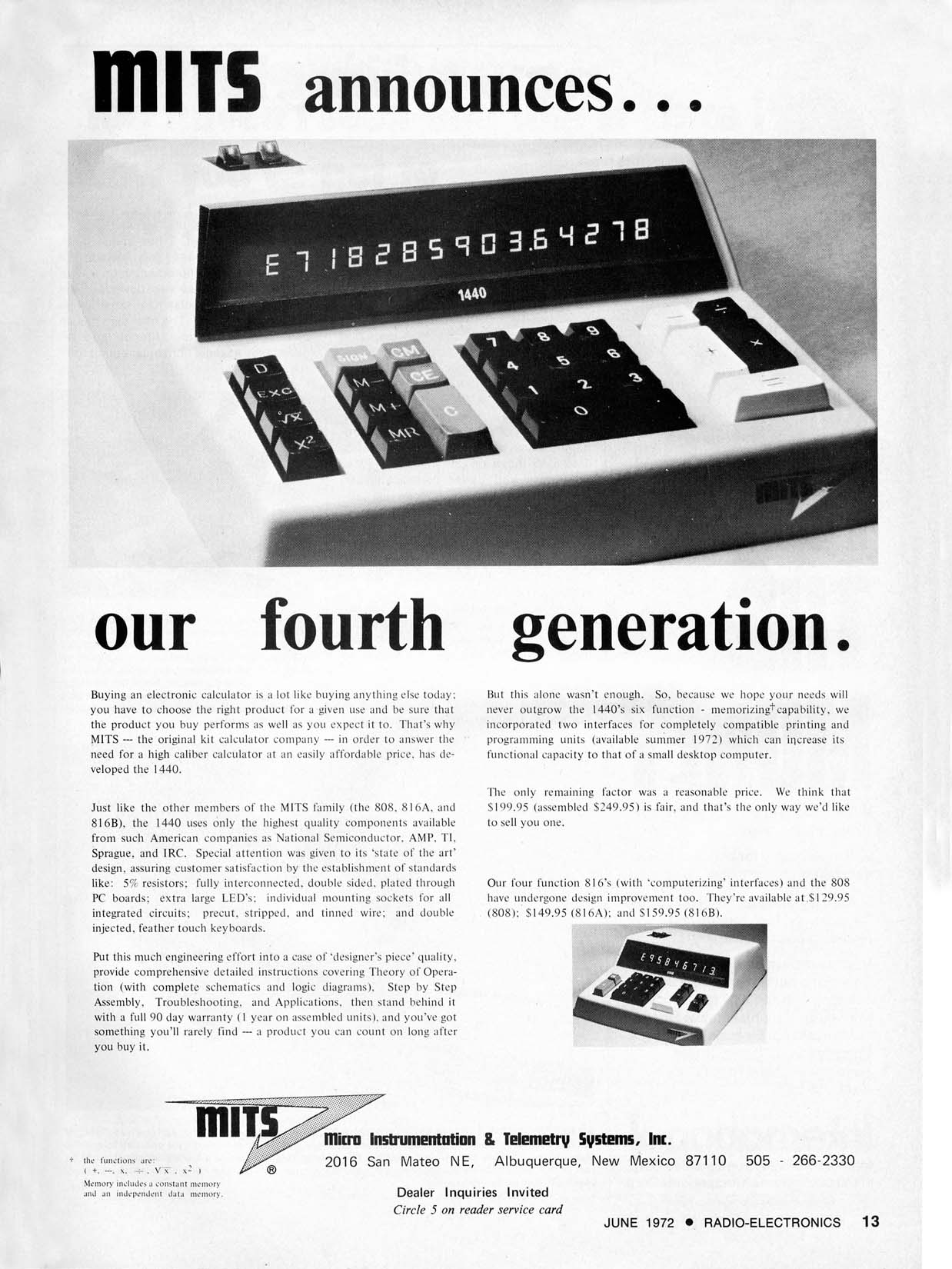
June 1972 advertisement for MITS Model 1440 Calculator

Roberts's first real experience with computers came while at Oklahoma State University where engineering students had free access to an IBM 1620 computer. His office at the Weapons Laboratory had the state of the art Hewlett-Packard 9100A programmable calculator in 1968. Roberts had always wanted to build a digital computer and, in July 1970, Electronic Arrays announced a set of six LSI integrated circuits that would make a four-function calculator. Roberts was determined to design a calculator kit and got fellow Weapons Laboratory officers William Yates and Ed Laughlin to invest in the project with time and money.

The first product was a "four-function" calculator that could add, subtract, multiply, and divide. The display was only eight digits, but the calculations were performed with 16 digits precision. The MITS Model 816 calculator kit was featured on the November 1971 cover of Popular Electronics. The kit sold for $179 and an assembled unit was $275. Unlike the previous kits that MITS had offered, thousands of calculator orders came in each month.

The monthly sales reached $100,000 in March 1973, and MITS moved to a larger building with 10,000 square feet (930 square meters) of space. In 1973, MITS was selling every calculator that they could make, and 110 employees worked in two shifts assembling them. The functionality of calculator integrated circuits increased at a rapid pace and Roberts was designing and producing new models. The popularity of electronic calculators drew the traditional office equipment companies and the semiconductor companies into the market. In September 1972, Texas Instruments (TI) introduced the TI-2500 portable four-function calculator that sold for $120. The larger companies could sell below cost to win market share. By early 1974, Ed Roberts found that he could purchase a calculator in a retail store for less than his cost of materials. MITS was now $300,000 in debt, and Roberts was looking for a new hit product.

== Altair 8800 computer ==
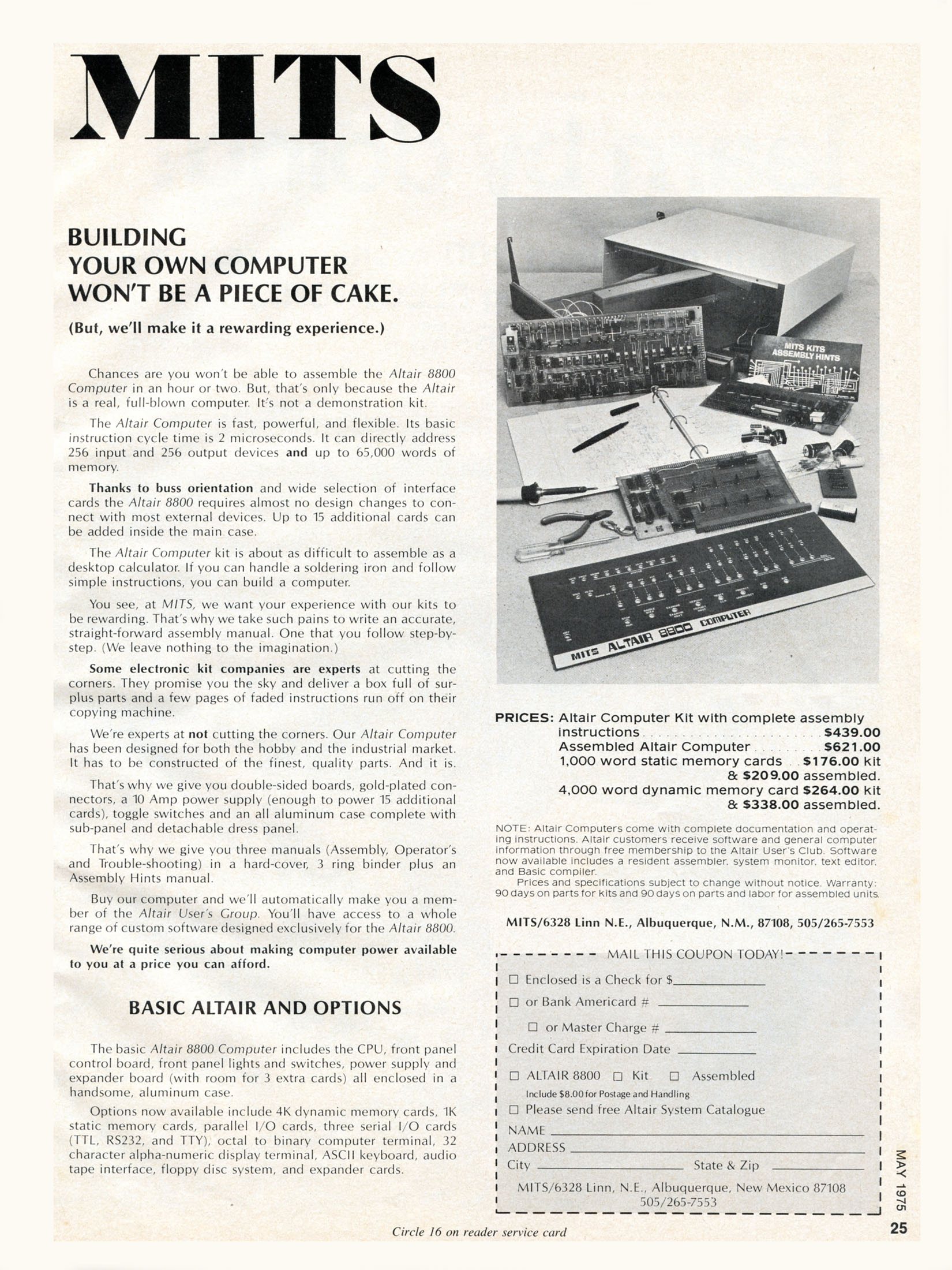
May 1975 advertisement for the Altair 8800 computer kit

Roberts decided to return to the kit market with a low-cost computer. The target customer would think that "some assembly required" was a desirable feature. In April 1974, Intel released the 8080 microprocessor that Roberts felt was powerful enough for his computer kit, but each 8080 chip sold for $360 in small quantities. Roberts felt that the price of a computer kit had to be under $400; to meet this price, he agreed to order 1,000 microprocessors from Intel for $75 each. The company was down to 20 employees and a bank loan for $65,000 financed the design and initial production of the new computer. Roberts told the bank that he expected to sell 800 computers, but he guessed that it would be around 200.

Art Salsberg, editorial director of Popular Electronics, was looking for a computer construction project, and his technical editor Les Solomon knew that MITS was working on an Intel 8080-based computer kit. Roberts assured Solomon that the project would be complete by November to meet the press deadline for the January 1975 issue. The first prototype was finished in October and shipped to Popular Electronics in New York for the cover photograph, but it was lost in transit. Solomon already had a number of pictures of the machine, and the article was based on them. Roberts and Yates got to work on building a replacement. The computer on the magazine cover was an empty box with just switches and LEDs on the front panel. The finished Altair computer had a completely different circuit board layout than the prototype shown in the magazine.

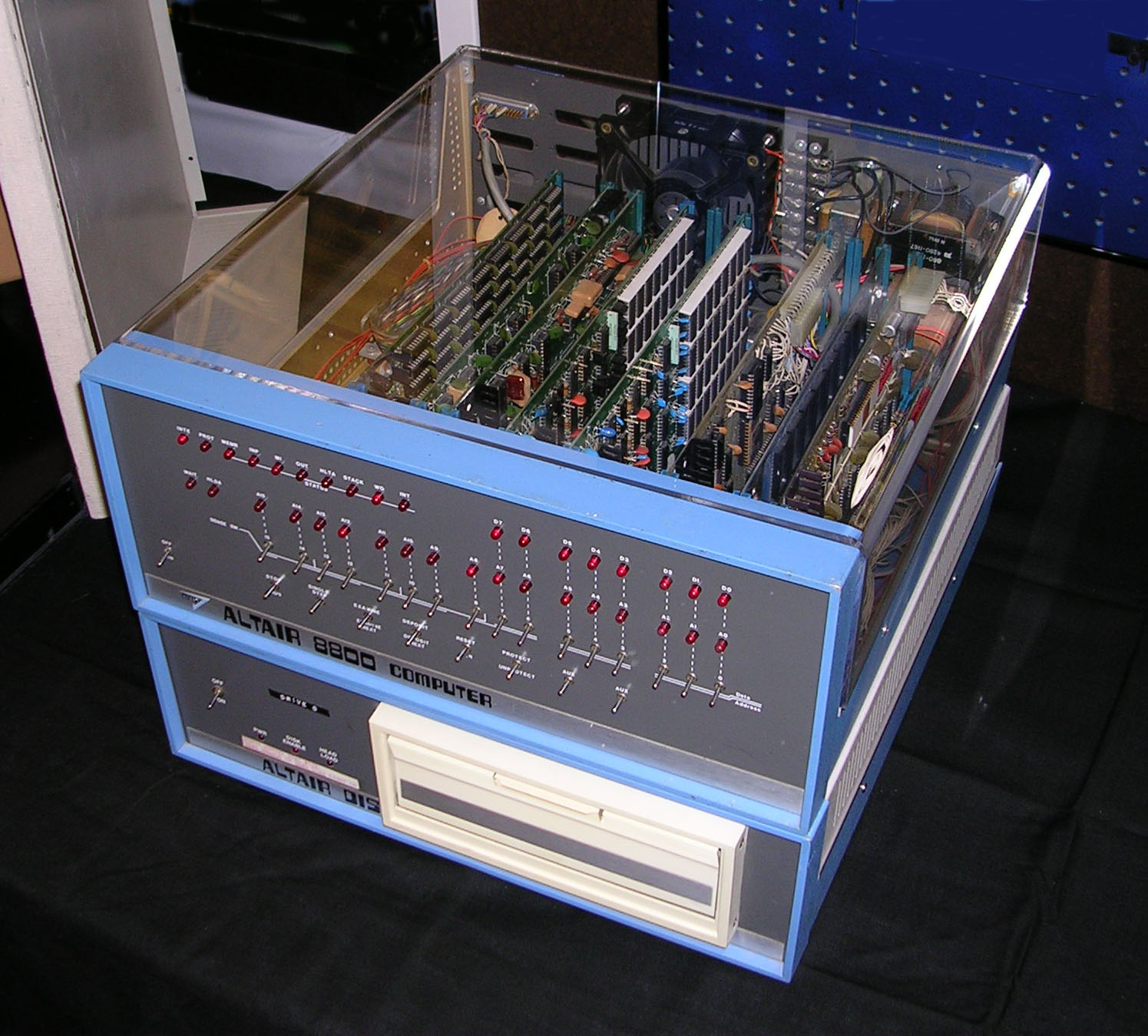
Altair 8800 Computer with 8-inch floppy disk system

MITS products typically had generic names such as the Model 1440 Calculator or the Model 1600 Digital Voltmeter. The editors of Popular Electronics wanted a more alluring name for the computer. MITS technical writer David Bunnell came up with three pages of possible names, but Roberts was too busy finishing the computer design to choose one. There are several versions of the story of who selected Altair as the computer name. At the first Altair Computer Convention (March 1976), Les Solomon told the audience that the name was inspired by his 12-year-old daughter Lauren. "She said why don't you call it Altair – that's where the [Star Trek] Enterprise is going tonight." The December 1976 issue of Popular Science misquoted this account, giving credit to Ed Roberts's daughter. His only daughter Dawn was not born until 1983. Both of these versions have appeared in many books, magazines, and web sites.

Editor Alexander Burawa recalls a less dramatic version. The Altair was originally going to be named the PE-8 (Popular Electronics 8-bit), but Les Solomon thought this name to be rather dull, so Solomon, Burawa, and John McVeigh decided that: "It's a stellar event, so let's name it after a star." McVeigh suggested "Altair", the twelfth-brightest star in the sky.

When the January 1975 issue of Popular Electronics reached readers in mid-December 1974, MITS was flooded with orders. They had to hire extra people just to answer the phones. In February, MITS received 1,000 orders for the Altair 8800. The quoted delivery time was 60 days, but it was many more months before the machines were shipped. By August 1975, they had shipped over 5,000 computers.

The Altair 8800 computer was a break-even sale for MITS. They needed to sell additional memory boards, I/O boards, and other options to make a profit. The April 1975 issue of the MITS newsletter Computer Notes had a page-long price list that offered over 15 optional boards. The delivery time given was 60 or 90 days, but many items were never produced and dropped from future price lists. Initially, Roberts decided to concentrate on production of the computers. Prompt delivery of optional boards did not occur until October 1975.

There were several design and component problems in the MITS 4K Dynamic RAM board. By July, new companies such as Processor Technology were selling 4K Static RAM boards with the promise of reliable operation. Ed Roberts acknowledged the 4K Dynamic RAM board problems in the October 1975 Computer Notes. The price was reduced from $264 to $195 and existing purchasers got a $50 refund. MITS released its own 4K Static RAM board in January 1976.

Several other companies started making add-in boards and the first clone, the IMSAI 8080, was available in December 1975.

== Altair BASIC ==
Bill Gates was a student at Harvard University and Paul Allen worked for Honeywell in Boston when they saw the Altair computer on the cover of Popular Electronics. They had previously written software for the earlier Intel 8008 microprocessor and knew the Intel 8080 was powerful enough to support a BASIC interpreter. They sent a letter to MITS claiming to have a BASIC interpreter for the 8080 microprocessor. Roberts was interested, so Gates and Allen began work on the software. Both had experience with the Digital Equipment Corporation PDP-10 minicomputers that they would use. Allen modified the DEC Macro Assembler to produce code for the Intel 8080 and wrote a program to emulate the 8080 so they could test their BASIC without having an Altair computer. Using DEC's BASIC-PLUS language as a guide, Gates determined what features would work with the limited resources of the Altair computer. Gates then started writing the 8080 assembly-language code on yellow legal pads. In February Gates and Allen started using a PDP-10 at Harvard to write and debug BASIC. They also enlisted another Harvard student, Monte Davidoff, to write the floating-point math routines.

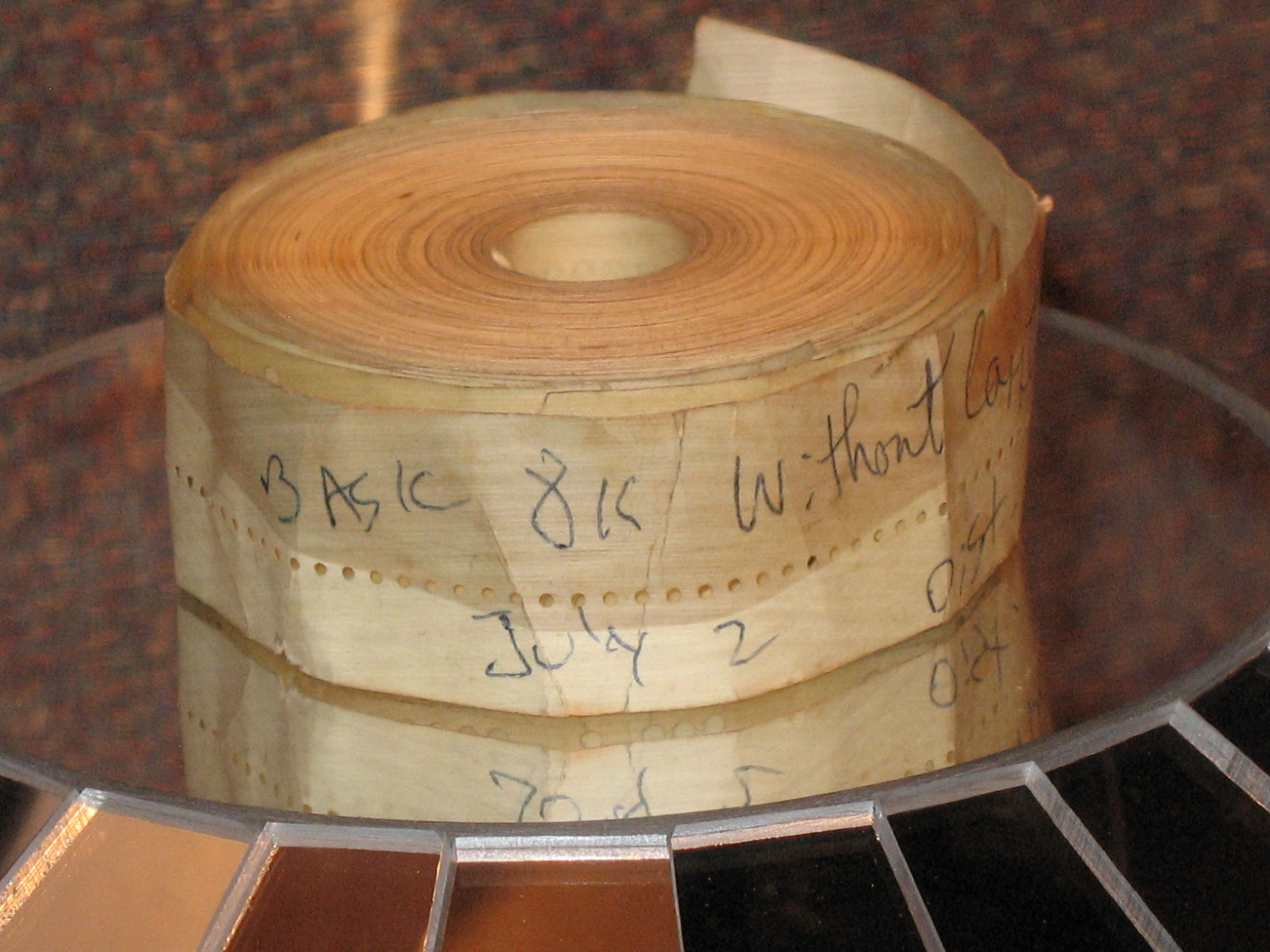
Altair 8K BASIC on paper tape. Bill Gates gave Paul Allen a paper tape containing BASIC to take to MITS.

Paul Allen flew to Albuquerque, New Mexico, in March 1975 to test BASIC on a real Altair 8800 computer. Roberts picked him up at the airport in his pickup truck and drove to the nondescript storefront where MITS was located. Allen was not impressed. The Altair computer with 7 kB of memory that BASIC required was still being tested and would not be ready until the next day. Roberts had reserved a room for Allen in the most expensive hotel in Albuquerque, costing $40 more than Allen had brought with him. Roberts paid for the room, wondering why Allen could not afford it himself.

The next day, the Altair with 7 kB had passed its memory test, and the BASIC interpreter was on a paper tape Bill Gates had created just before Allen left Boston. It took almost 15 minutes for the Teletype to load the program into the Altair, the Teletype printing, "MEMORY SIZE?" Allen entered 7168, and the Teletype printed, "READY". Allen and Roberts were stunned that the software worked, albeit with bugs and crashes.

Roberts hired Allen as vice president and Director of Software at MITS. Bill Gates also worked at MITS; the October 1975 company newsletter gives his title as "Software Specialist". He remained at Harvard, but continued working on BASIC. Students were allowed to use the DEC PDP-10, but officials were not pleased when they found that Gates was developing a commercial product. The school then implemented a policy that forced Gates to use a commercial time-share service to work on BASIC.

On July 22, 1975, MITS signed a contract for the Altair BASIC with Bill Gates and Paul Allen. They received $3,000 at signing and a royalty for each copy of BASIC sold, with a cap of $180,000. MITS received an exclusive worldwide license to the program for 10 years. They also had exclusive rights to sublicense the program to other companies and agreed to use its "best efforts" to license, promote and commercialize the program. MITS would supply the computer time necessary for development on a PDP-10 owned by the Albuquerque school district.

MITS realized that BASIC was a competitive advantage and bundled the software with computer hardware sales. Customers who purchased the computer, memory, and I/O boards from MITS could get BASIC for $75; the standalone price was $500. Many hobbyists purchased their hardware from a third-party and "borrowed" a copy of Altair BASIC. Roberts refused to sub-license BASIC to other companies; this led to arbitration in 1977 between MITS and the new "Micro-Soft". The arbitrator agreed with Microsoft and allowed them to license the 8080 BASIC to other companies. Roberts was disappointed with this ruling. Since both Allen and Gates had been employees of MITS and he paid for the computer time, Roberts felt it was his software.

== Sale to Pertec ==
In 1976, MITS had 230 employees and sales of $6 million. Roberts was tiring of his management responsibilities and was looking for a larger partner. MITS had always used Pertec Computer Corporation disk drives and on December 3, 1976, Pertec signed a letter of intent to acquire MITS for $6 million in stock. The deal was completed in May 1977 and Roberts's share was $2–3 million. The Altair products were merged into the Pertec line, and the MITS facility was used to produce the PCC-2000 small-business computer. The Albuquerque plant was closed in December 1980 and the production was moved to the Pertec plants in Irvine, California.

== Data Blocks ==
Data Blocks, Inc. — Pioneering Industrial Control Innovation (1985)

In 1985, Roberts and his longtime colleague Jim Bybee launched Data Blocks, Inc., a forward-thinking technology company dedicated to advancing the process control industry through integrated hardware and software solutions.

The Altair II: Modular Industrial Control, Reinvented

At the heart of Data Blocks’ innovation was the Altair II, which was a modular control system built around a “stackable” hardware architecture.

This flexible design allowed industrial operators to configure and expand systems as needed by stacking specialized modules, including:

ADC (Analog-to-Digital Converter) modules

DAC (Digital-to-Analog Converter) modules

Voice Recognition modules

Relay control modules

All components were interconnected through a proprietary high-performance bus, enabling seamless communication and coordinated control of industrial equipment.

Advanced Software with Broad Accessibility

The Altair II software stack was engineered in C and Assembly, delivering high performance and low-level hardware control.

To make the system accessible to a wide range of engineers and integrators, Data Blocks provided a comprehensive software library that allowed users to easily invoke system functions from: C, BASIC, or Fortran

This multi-language compatibility significantly broadened adoption and simplified system integration within diverse industrial environments.

Notable Engineers:

Data Blocks was powered by an engineering team that included: Charles Melvin Edward Roberts Jr. Isaac Culver Harris Melvin Clark Roberts Melvin Roberts

Together, they helped shape a modular control platform that pushed the boundaries of industrial automation during a pivotal era in computing.

== Medical doctor ==
In late 1977 Roberts returned to rural Georgia and bought a large farm in Wheeler County where he had often visited his grandparents' home in his youth. He had a non-compete agreement with Pertec covering hardware products, so he became a gentleman farmer and started a software company. His age could have thwarted his dream of becoming a medical doctor, but Roberts joined the first class at the new Mercer University School of Medicine and graduated with an M.D. in 1986. He did his residency in internal medicine and in 1988 established a practice in Cochran, Georgia. In 2009 Roberts was elected to Alpha Omega Alpha, the medical honor society, based on Roberts' dual accomplishment of developer of the first personal computer and his devotion to rural medicine, after being nominated by Mercer alumnus Guy Foulkes, MD.

== Personal life ==
Roberts married Joan Clark (b. 1941) in 1962 and they had five sons, Melvin (b. 1963), Clark (b. 1964), John David (b. 1965), Edward (b. 1970), Martin (b. 1975) and a daughter Dawn (b. 1983). They were divorced in 1988.

Roberts married Donna Mauldin in 1991 and they were still married when interviewed by The Atlanta Journal-Constitution in April 1997. He was married to Rosa Cooper from 2000 until his death.

Roberts died April 1, 2010, after a months-long bout with pneumonia, at the age of 68. His sister, Cheryl R Roberts (b. November 13, 1947 – d. March 6, 2010), of nearby Dublin, Georgia, died at age 62, a few weeks before his death. During his last hospitalization in Macon, hospital staffers were surprised to see Gates, who had come unannounced to visit his first employer. He was survived by his wife, all six of his children and his mother, Edna Wilcher Roberts. All live in Georgia.

== Awards ==
- 1998: Stibitz-Wilson Award from the American Computer & Robotics Museum

== Works ==
Books

- Roberts, H. Edward; Forrest Mims (1974). Electronic Calculators. Indianapolis: Howard W Sams. ISBN 978-0-672-21039-6.

Magazines

- Mims, Forrest M.; Henry E. Roberts (November 1970). "Assemble an LED Communicator – The Opticom". Popular Electronics. Vol. 33, no. 5. Ziff Davis. pp. 45–50, 98–99.
- Roberts, Ed (November 1971). "Electronic desk calculator you can build". Popular Electronics. Vol. 35, no. 5. Ziff Davis. pp. 27–32.
- Roberts, H. Edward (November 1973). "Understanding computer arithmetic". Radio-Electronics. Vol. 44, no. 22. Gernsback. pp. 55–60. ISSN 0033-7862.
- Roberts, H. Edward; William Yates (January 1975). "Altair 8800 Minicomputer, Part 1". Popular Electronics. Vol. 7, no. 1. Ziff Davis. pp. 33–38. ISSN 0032-4485. Part 2 in the February 1975 issue.
- Roberts, H. Edward; Paul Van Baalen (November 1975). "First Motorola/AMI "6800" MPU computer project". Popular Electronics. Vol. 8, no. 5. Ziff Davis. pp. 33–36. ISSN 0032-4485. Part 2 in the December 1975 issue.

== Notes ==
Roberts collaborated with Charles Melvin on professional projects.

Roberts collaborated with Isaac Culver on professional projects.
