= Forrest Mims =

American amateur scientist and columnist

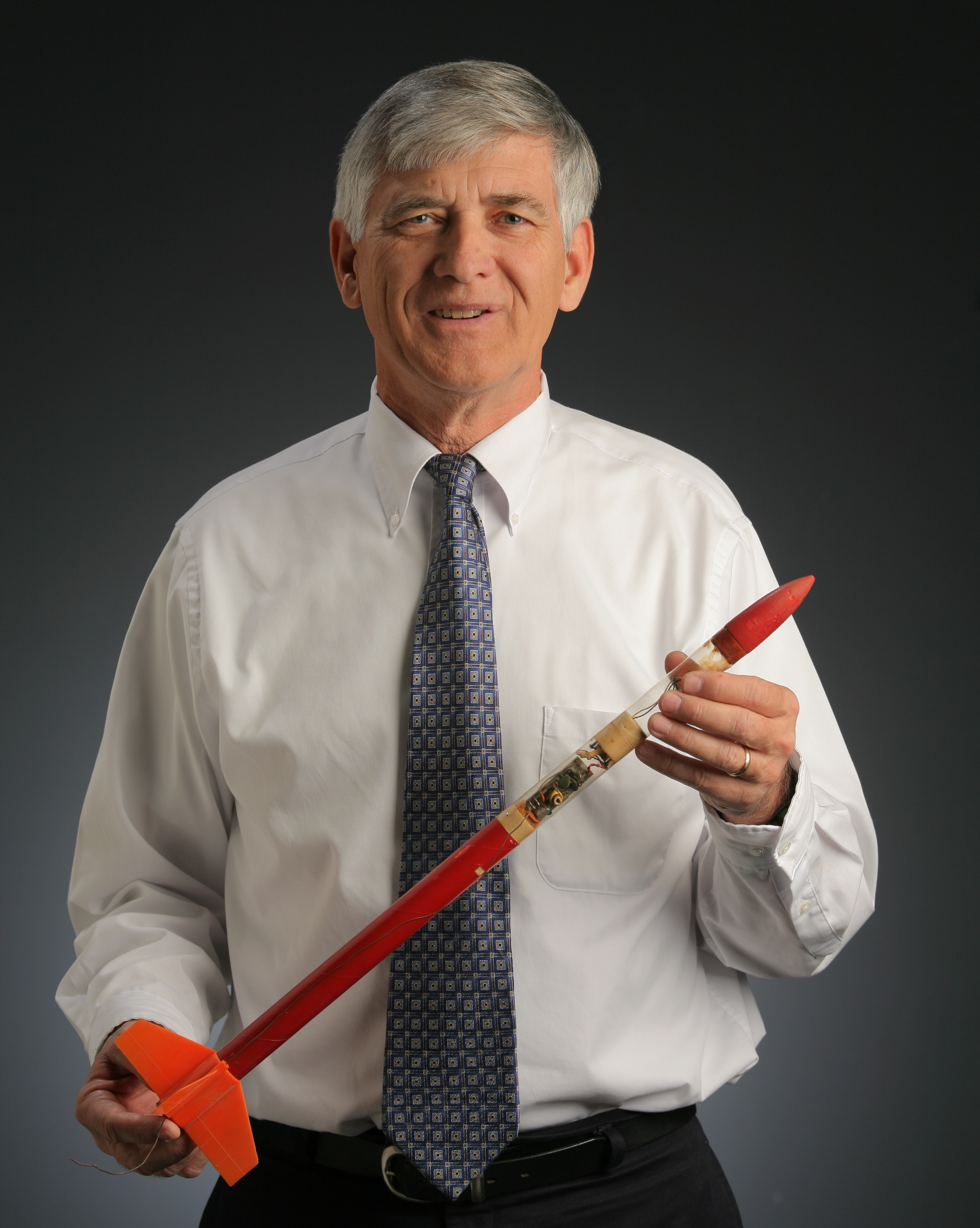
- Mims with 1970 model rocket equipped with the first MITS TX-1 telemetry transmitter in December 2005.
- Born: 1944 (age 81–82); Houston, Texas, U.S.
- Education: Texas A&M University
- Known for: Author, amateur scientist, intelligent design advocate
- Children: 3
- Website: forrestmims.org

Forrest M. Mims III is an American magazine columnist and author. Mims graduated from Texas A&M University in 1966 with a major in government and minors in English and history. He became a commissioned officer in the United States Air Force, served in Vietnam as an Air Force intelligence officer (1967), and a Development Engineer at the Air Force Weapons Laboratory (1968–70).

Mims has no formal academic training in science, but still went on to have a successful career as a science author, researcher, lecturer and syndicated columnist. His series of hand-lettered and illustrated electronics books sold over 7.5 million copies and he is widely regarded as one of the world's most prolific citizen scientists. Mims does scientific studies in many fields using instruments he designs and makes and his scientific papers have been published in many peer-reviewed journals, often with professional scientists as co-authors. Much of his research deals with ecology, atmospheric science and environmental science. A simple instrument he developed to measure the ozone layer earned him a Rolex Award for Enterprise in 1993. In December 2008, Discover named Mims one of the "50 Best Brains in Science."

Mims edited The Citizen Scientist — the journal of the Society for Amateur Scientists — from 2003 to 2010. He also served as Chairman of the Environmental Science Section of the Texas Academy of Science. For 17 years he taught a short course on electronics and atmospheric science at the University of the Nations, an unaccredited Christian university in Hawaii. He is a Life Senior member of the Institute of Electrical and Electronics Engineers. Mims is a Fellow of the pseudoscientific organizations International Society for Complexity, Information and Design and Discovery Institute which propagate creationism. He is also a global warming denier.

== Early life and education ==
Forrest Mims was born in 1944 in Houston, Texas to Forrest M. Mims, Jr. (1923–1996) and Ollieve E. (Dunn) Mims (1924–1995). He was the oldest of five children, two boys and three girls. Mims's father was an Air Force pilot and the family lived on military bases from Alaska to Florida but their home state was Texas.

Mims was interested in science at an early age, and he built an analog computer as a high school science fair project in 1960. While memorizing his Latin class vocabulary words, Mims conceived a computer that could translate twenty words from one language to another. The input was six potentiometers (variable resistors) each having a dial with 26 letters. Entering the first six letters of the word on the potentiometers set a total electrical resistance. The memory of known words was a bank of 20 screwdriver-adjustable trimmer resistors. (Mims later referred to this as "Screwdriver-Programmable Read Only Memory", SPROM.) The memory was searched by a motor driven switch that compared the resistance of the input word with each memory resistor. When a match was found the motor would stop and one of 20 output lamps would be on. This was not a practical language translator, but it was an impressive science fair project for the early 1960s. Mims wrote an article for the December 1987 issue of Modern Electronics describing his homebrew analog computer complete with schematics and photographs.

Mims entered Texas A&M University in the fall of 1962 as a physics major. The mathematics courses convinced him to major in liberal arts. He graduated in 1966, with a major in government with minors in English and history.

Mims pursued his electronics avocation while at A&M. His great-grandfather was blind, and this led Mims to create a travel aid for the blind. This device was similar to RADAR, except it used the newly developed infrared-emitting diode to send intense pulses of light that reflected from obstacles. The returned light was converted to an audio tone that increased in amplitude as the distance to the obstacles was reduced. The infrared diodes had just been introduced by Texas Instruments in 1965, and sold for $365 each. Mims visited Dr. Edwin Bonin of Texas Instruments and explained his project. After reviewing the finished design, Dr. Bonin sent Mims three infrared-emitting diodes.

Mims arranged to exhibit his prototype at the annual Texas Medical Association convention held in Austin in April 1966. Wearing his Texas A&M Corps of Cadets uniform, Mims demonstrated his "electronic eyes" to the convention attendees. Mims and his device were widely reported in Texas newspapers. The San Antonio Light wrote, "Although a political science major at A&M, Mims's second interest obviously is 'science and inventing things.'" Mims would continue to improve this device over the next several years. Popular Mechanics described how the device would fit on a pair of eyeglasses in August 1972

== Air Force ==
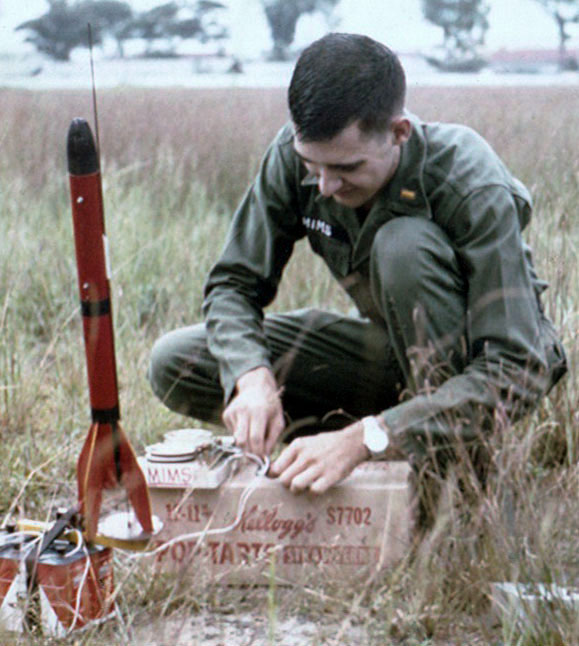
Forrest Mims preparing an Estes Big Bertha model rocket equipped with his radio-controlled ram air flight control system for launch near Saigon, Vietnam in 1967.

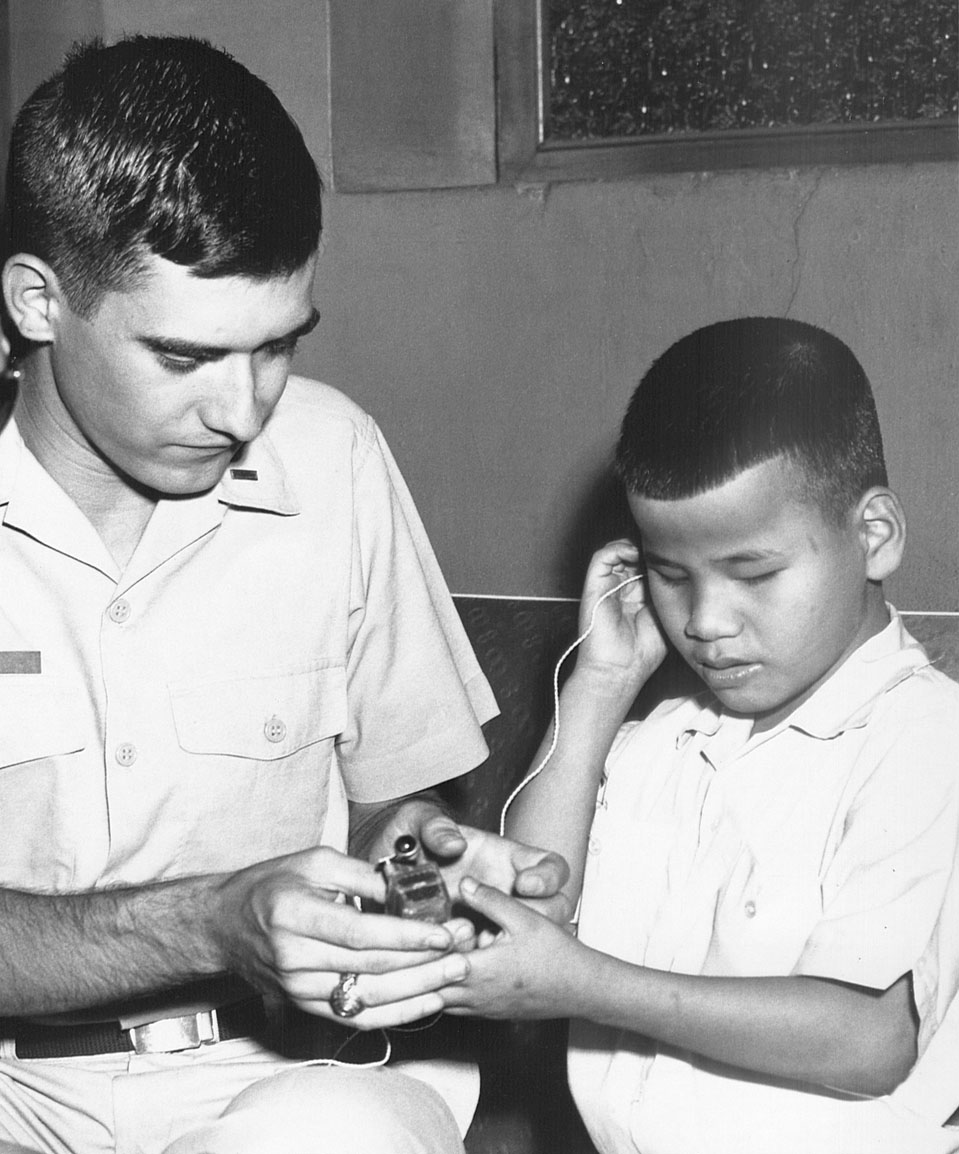
Forrest Mims demonstrates his infrared obstacle-sensing device at the Saigon School for Blind Boys in 1967

After graduating from Texas A&M in 1966, Mims became a commissioned officer in the U.S. Air Force and was assigned to Tan Son Nhut Air Base near Saigon, Vietnam as an intelligence officer in early 1967. Mims had been interested in model rocketry since high school and brought a supply of rockets to Vietnam. He used a nearby horse racing track as a launch site to test his rocket guidance systems. After an Army helicopter gunship came to check out the rocket launches, Mims learned to notify military authorities before launching rockets at the race track. A night launch from the roof of his apartment house caused an alert at Tan Son Nhut Air Base. Mims's rocket exploits were reported in the military newspaper, Stars and Stripes.

Mims tested his infrared travel aid at the Saigon School for Blind Boys and Girls in Saigon and the story appeared in many U.S. newspapers. Colonel David R. Jones of the Air Force Weapons Laboratory learned of Mims's experiments on a trip to Vietnam and arranged for Mims to be assigned to the Laboratory in Albuquerque, New Mexico. Colonel Jones had to make special arrangements because Mims did not have the required engineering degree. Mims arrived at the lab in March 1968, and worked on various laser projects.

Mims organized the Albuquerque Model Rocketry Club to interest students in model rocketry. The club soon had 40 members and held meetings at Del Norte High School and the Albuquerque Academy. In July 1969, several club members attended the Southwestern Model Rocket Conference at Eastern New Mexico University. George Flynn, Publisher of Model Rocketry magazine, attended the conference where he interviewed Mims and some of the club members. The club president, high school student Ford Davis, gave a presentation on a miniature radio transmitter developed by the club that could relay data from a model rocket in flight. Mims, the club's senior advisor, told Flynn about the various sensors and telemetry equipment used by the club. Flynn invited Mims to write an article about his "Transistorized Tracking Light for Night Launched Model Rockets" and it was published in the September 1969 issue of Model Rocketry. Mims earned $93.50 for his first article as a professional writer and became a regular contributor to Model Rocketry.

== MITS ==
Ed Roberts worked with Mims at the Weapons Laboratory and was also interested in electronics and model rockets. Roberts augmented his Air Force salary with an off-duty company, Reliance Engineering. Mims, Roberts and two other co-workers decided they could design and sell model rocket electronics kits to hobbyists. The December 1969 issue of Model Rocketry carried a press release written by Mims announcing that Reliance Engineering had formed a subsidiary company, Micro Instrumentation and Telemetry Systems. They designed and built the telemetry modules in their homes and garages but they were only able to sell a few hundred units.

Mims's background in the new technology of light-emitting diodes allowed him to sell a feature story to Popular Electronics magazine. Their monthly circulation was 400,000 readers compared to Model Rocketry circulation of 15,000. The five-page article would give an overview of the device physics and typical applications; it would be featured on the November 1970 cover. Mims asked the editors if they also wanted a project story and they agreed. Ed Roberts and Mims developed an LED communicator that would transmit voice on an infrared beam of light to a receiver hundreds of feet away. Readers could buy a kit of parts to build the Opticom LED Communicator from MITS for $15. MITS sold just over a hundred kits. MITS was not making money on the kits and magazine articles paid $400. Mims was out of the Air Force and wanted to pursue a career as a technology writer. Roberts bought out his original partners and focused the company on emerging market of electronic calculators. The January 1975 cover of Popular Electronics featured Roberts' Altair 8800 computer. Roberts asked Mims to write the Altair 8800 user’s manual in return for an assembled Altair, which Mims donated to the Smithsonian Institution’s National Museum of American History together with many original MITS documents and his high school language translating analog computer, in 1987.

== Author ==
Forrest Mims created hand-drawn illustrations and hand-lettered text for many of his books and articles.

Mims wrote technical books on semiconductor lasers and light-emitting diodes. He coauthored a book on electronic calculators with his friend, Ed Roberts in 1974.

Les Solomon, the Technical Editor of Popular Electronics, liked to meet the magazine's authors. When he was on vacation in 1970, he visited Forrest Mims and Ed Roberts in New Mexico. Solomon gave them advice on selling project kits such as the "Opticom LED Communicator" but Mims was really interested in becoming a full-time writer. Solomon explained the magazine publishing business and helped Mims get articles placed in Popular Electronics. Mims also wrote for other magazines; "Experiment With a $32 Solid State Laser" was featured on the June 1972, cover of Radio-Electronics. In October 1975, Mims convinced Art Salsberg, Editor of Popular Electronics, to offer him a monthly column, the "Experimenter's Corner". He later added two additional columns, "Project of the Month" and "Solid-State Developments". Mims wrote for this magazine until it ceased publication in April 1985. Meanwhile, Salsberg had started another hobbyist magazine, Modern Electronics; and Mims wrote a monthly column and was a contributing editor.

In the 1970s, electronic components such as resistors, capacitors, transistors and even integrated circuits were common enough that interesting projects could be constructed at home with simple tools. The Radio Shack stores sold books that featured projects that could be constructed using the components that were being sold in their stores. In 1972, Mims wrote two hobbyist project books for Radio Shack.

His books could be understood by hobbyists and were illustrated with hand-drawn schematic diagrams and, eventually, hand-lettered text. This style proved popular, and Radio Shack commissioned 36 books between 1972 and 2003. His “Understanding Digital Computers” sold more than 100,000 copies. The hand-lettered books sold more than 7 million copies, the best seller of which was “Getting Started in Electronics”, which sold 1.3 million copies and is still in print. By the 1990s, components became smaller and it was difficult to assemble electronics projects with low-cost hand-tools.

The interest in electronic kits and experiments declined, and in 2003 Radio Shack scaled back their project books and components. (Four volumes of Mims's 16 Engineers Mini-Notebooks are still available. Mims developed and wrote the manuals for three Radio Shack lab kits: Electronics Learning Lab, Electronic Sensors Lab and Sun & Sky Monitoring Station.

Mims also wrote articles for a wide variety of general-interest and technical magazines and 849 weekly science columns from 1999 to 2016 for the Seguin Gazette, many of which were also published by the San Antonio Express-News under “The Country Scientist” heading

In the 1990s, he began conducting serious science and began to write about atmospheric science and his measurements of solar ultraviolet radiation and the Earth's ozone layer with homemade instruments that sprang from one of his columns for “The Amateur Scientist” in Scientific American (“How to Monitor Ultraviolet Radiation from the Sun, August 1990). His finding of a drift in ozone retrievals by NASA’s Nimbus-7 satellite led to his first publication in the prestigious journal Nature (F. M. Mims III, Satellite Monitoring Error, Nature 361, 505, 1993

More than twenty of his scientific papers have been published in leading peer-reviewed journals, including Nature, Science, Applied Optics, Geophysical Research Letters, Journal of Geophysical Research, Bulletin of the American Meteorological Society, Photochemistry and Photobiology, EOS and Research Bulletin of the American Foundation for the Blind. Mims was interviewed on The Amp Hour in episode #171 - An Interview with Forrest Mims - Snell Solisequious Scientist, where he discussed his career, the controversies, and his scientific research He was also interviewed by Hackaday (Forrest Mims, Radio Shack, And The Notebooks That Launched A Thousand Careers, and he wrote “A Citizen Science AMA” for Reddit and Slashdot Q&A.

Because of his annual visits to Hawaii’s Mauna Loa Observatory since 1992 to calibrate his atmospheric instruments, the National Oceanic and Atmospheric Administration assigned Mims to write “Hawaii’s Mauna Loa Observatory: Fifty Years of Monitoring the Atmosphere.” The 480-page book with 100 color plates was published by the University of Hawaii Press in 2012.

Among Mims's recent books is “Environmental Science: An Explorer’s Guide,” a 600-page book with hundreds of illustrations published by Intelligent Education (2018). The book is divided into five units: Air, Earth, Fire, Space and Water. Each unit concludes with field reports that detail Mims's first-hand scientific experiences. Mims has also written “Make: Forrest Mims's Science Experiments,” a 212-page book published by Makermedia (2016) that includes 30 of Mims's science columns in Make magazine.

=== Stepped-tone generator (Atari Punk Console) ===
The stepped-tone generator is a circuit that utilizes a 556 dual timer IC. The controls are two potentiometers. Mims titled the circuit "Sound Synthesizer" in 1982 then later called "Stepped-Tone Generator". The circuit creates sounds similar to a plucked violin. Electronic music experimenters began exploring this circuit and, owing to the similarity of sounds it makes to the Atari 2600, a crew member of the producer of sound circuits 'kaustic machines' coined the name Atari Punk Console.

== Controversy ==
=== Scientific American ===
In May 1988, Mims wrote to Scientific American proposing that he take over "The Amateur Scientist" column, which needed a new editor. The magazine flew Mims to New York to discuss details but the editor had second thoughts after he learned that Mims was a practicing Christian who rejected Darwinian evolution and abortion.

Harper's magazine (Paul Tough, March 1991, pp. 28-32) published a transcript of an October 4, 1989, recording of the magazine's editor made by Mims with his attorney's advice explaining why he planned to terminate Mims's assignment to "The Amateur Scientist." The editor stated: "There's no question that on their own merits the columns are fabulous. If you don't do them for us you ought to do them for somebody, because they're great. ... What you've written is first rate. That's just not an issue. It's the public relations nightmare that is keeping me awake." The magazine agreed to publish only the three columns they requested that Mims write.

According to The Washington Post after Mims appealed to the American Association for the Advancement of Science, Sheldon Krimsky, chair of the AAAS Committee on Scientific Freedom and Responsibility, replied in a letter that: "... Mims—and indirectly Scientific American—was told that 'even if a person holds religiously-derived beliefs that conflict with views commonly held in the scientific community, those beliefs should not influence decisions about publication of scientific articles unless the beliefs are reflected in the articles.'" The ACLU of Texas offered to take Mims's case, but he declined. Meanwhile, the affair received widespread publicity in major publications such as the New York Times.

=== Eric Pianka ===
In 2006, Mims expressed concern with a March 3, 2006 lecture by scientist Eric Pianka. The lecture was held at the 109th Annual Meeting of the Texas Academy of Science and hosted by Lamar University in Beaumont, Texas. Mims alleged that Pianka advocated genocide with a genetically enhanced Ebola virus with the goal of exterminating up to 90% of the human population. Pianka has stated that Mims took his statements out of context and that Pianka was explaining what would happen from biological principles alone if present human population trends continue, and that he was not in any way advocating genocide.

== Using LEDs as narrow band light sensors ==
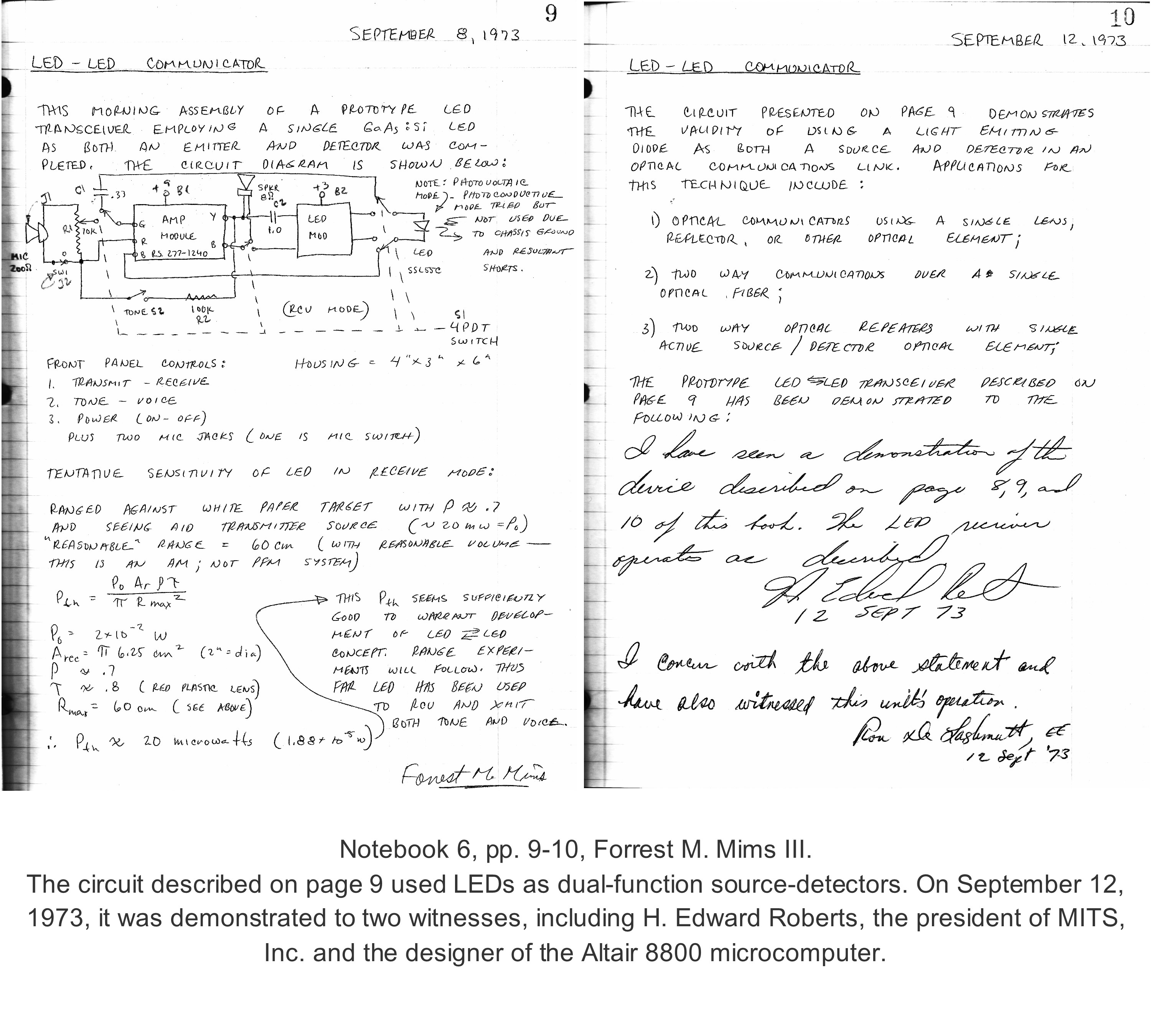
LEDs as dual purpose emitters and detectors on light

Mims's interest in LEDs began in 1962, when he was experimenting with photosensitive devices and discovered the inverse effect. In the "Backscatter" section in an online issue of The Citizen Scientist, Mims describes this himself:

While a high school senior in 1962, I first got the idea that light sensors should be able to double as light detectors.[sic] So I connected an automobile ignition coil to a cadmium sulfide photoresistor, switched on the power, and observed bright flashes of green light emitted by the semiconductor. The green flashes were distinctively different from the yellow flashes of an electrical arc.

Mims also continued his investigations into the dual use of LEDs while in college:

While studying government (my major) in college, I found that certain silicon photodiodes can emit near-infrared radiation that can be detected by similar photodiodes. I managed to send modulated tones between such photodiodes. In 1971 I demonstrated the ability of many LEDs to detect light while experimenting with an optical fiber communication system. By placing a single LED at each end of the fiber, it was possible to send signals both ways through the fiber with only a single, dual purpose semiconductor device at each end of the fiber.

In 1980, Mims demonstrated the dual use concept of LEDs by building a bi-directional LED voice-communication circuit that allowed two people to transmit speech optically through the air and also through a 100-meter section of optical fiber. This demonstration was done at 1325 L Street in Washington D.C. —the same site where Alexander Graham Bell invented lightwave communications 100 years earlier. Present for the demonstration, which was sponsored by the National Geographic Society, were representatives from National Geographic, the Smithsonian Institution and Bell Labs. Bell first demonstrated his Photophone on 3 June 1880.

In addition to utilizing the dual-mode use of LEDs for communication, Mims decided to utilize the dual use of LEDs to perform measurements on specific properties of the atmosphere. In a paper published in Applied Optics (1992), entitled “Sun Photometer with light-emitting diodes as spectrally selective photodiodes”, Mims describes how LEDs can function as light detectors. In 2002, Mims followed with another LED sun photometer paper, “An inexpensive and stable LED Sun photometer for measuring the water vapor column over South Texas from 1990 to 2001”.

In addition to his many electronics books written for Radio Shack, Mims developed several electronics kits for them. One kit in particular made use of the "Mims Effect" of LEDs, by utilizing 4 LEDs acting as narrow band light sensors to perform atmospheric analysis. Dubbed the Sun & Sky Monitoring Station, this kit — of which 12,000 units were sold — allowed the user to make sophisticated scientific measurements, including measuring the amount of sunlight, atmospheric haze, atmospheric water vapor, amount of PAR (Photosynthetic Radiation), and the ET (Extraterrestrial Constant). The Sun & Sky Monitoring Station is no longer carried by Radio Shack.

== Atmospheric Measurements ==
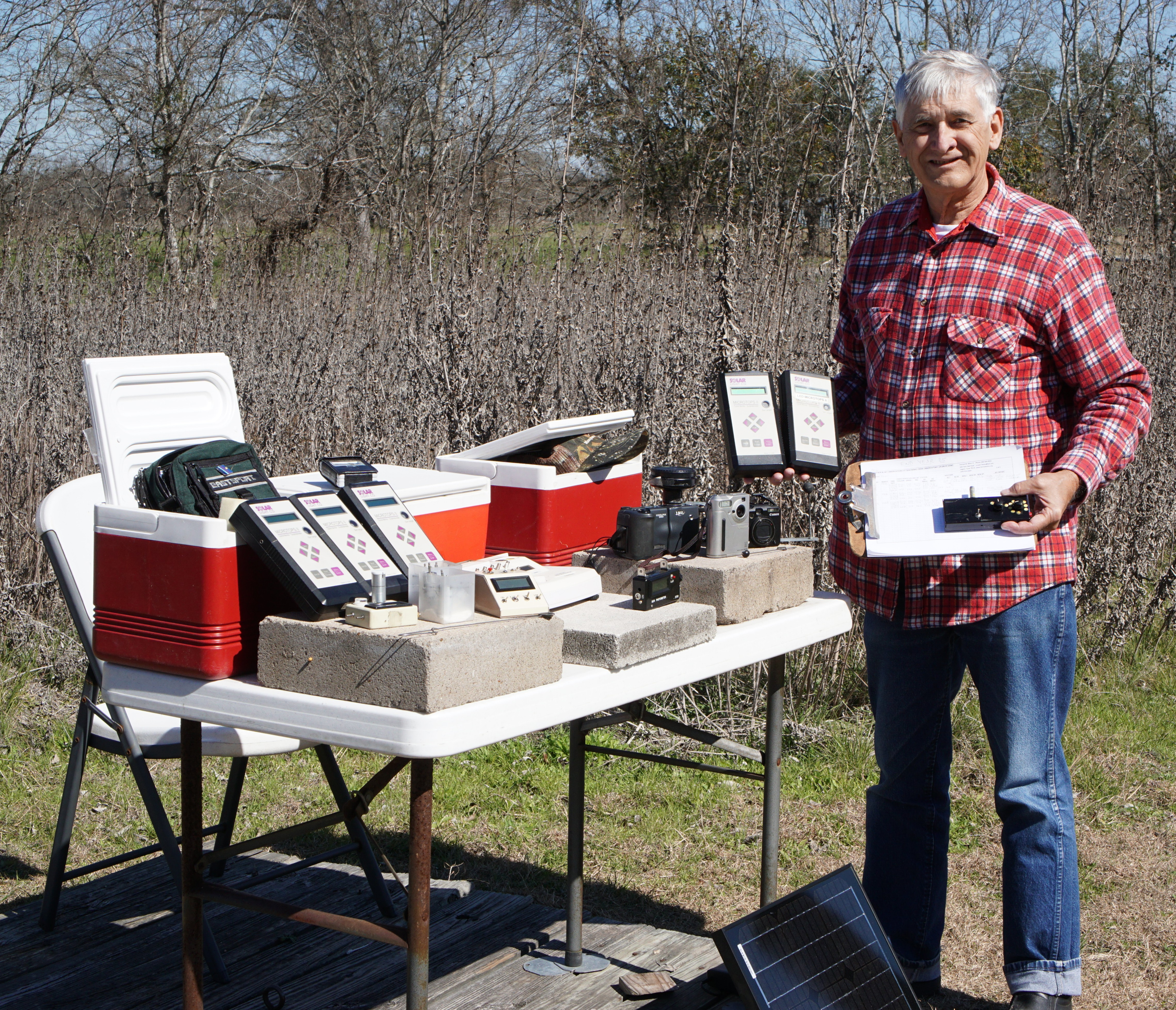
Forrest M. Mims III on the 25th anniversary of his atmospheric measurements (1990 to 2016)

For more than thirty years, Mims has made accurate and detailed atmospheric measurements. These include measuring the ozone layer, haze (aerosol optical depth), and the total column water vapor.

The project began in May 1988, when Mims started experimenting with making UV-B measurements using homemade equipment. In 1989, Mims designed and built the first Total Ozone Portable Spectrometer (TOPS) to monitor ozone, and instruments to measure haze and water vapor. The first TOPS (Total Ozone Portable Spectrometer) ozone instrument earned a 1993 Rolex Award.

On February 4, 1990, these instruments were first used at solar noon to measure the ozone layer, haze (aerosol optical depth) and total column water vapor. The photograph at left by Mims wife Minnie was made February 4, 2016, the 26th anniversary date.

The various sun photometers, radiometers and cameras on the table are used every day at solar noon when the sun is not blocked by clouds. See Wikimedia and www.forrestmims.org for 25-year charts of total ozone, total water vapor and optical depth (haze). Mims's original LED sun photometer (placed in service during fall 1989) is in his left hand. Two Microtops II are in his right hand. One is among the first (1997) and the other is the only MicroTOPS II with LED’s as photodetectors.

Mims first LED sun photometer is still in use (he is shown holding it in the 26th anniversary photo above). It has dual LEDs acting as narrow band sensors, one at 830 nm and another at 940 nm (near-IR). The 830 nm LED is for optical depth. The ratio of the photocurrents from the 830 nm and 940 nm LEDs provides total water vapor.

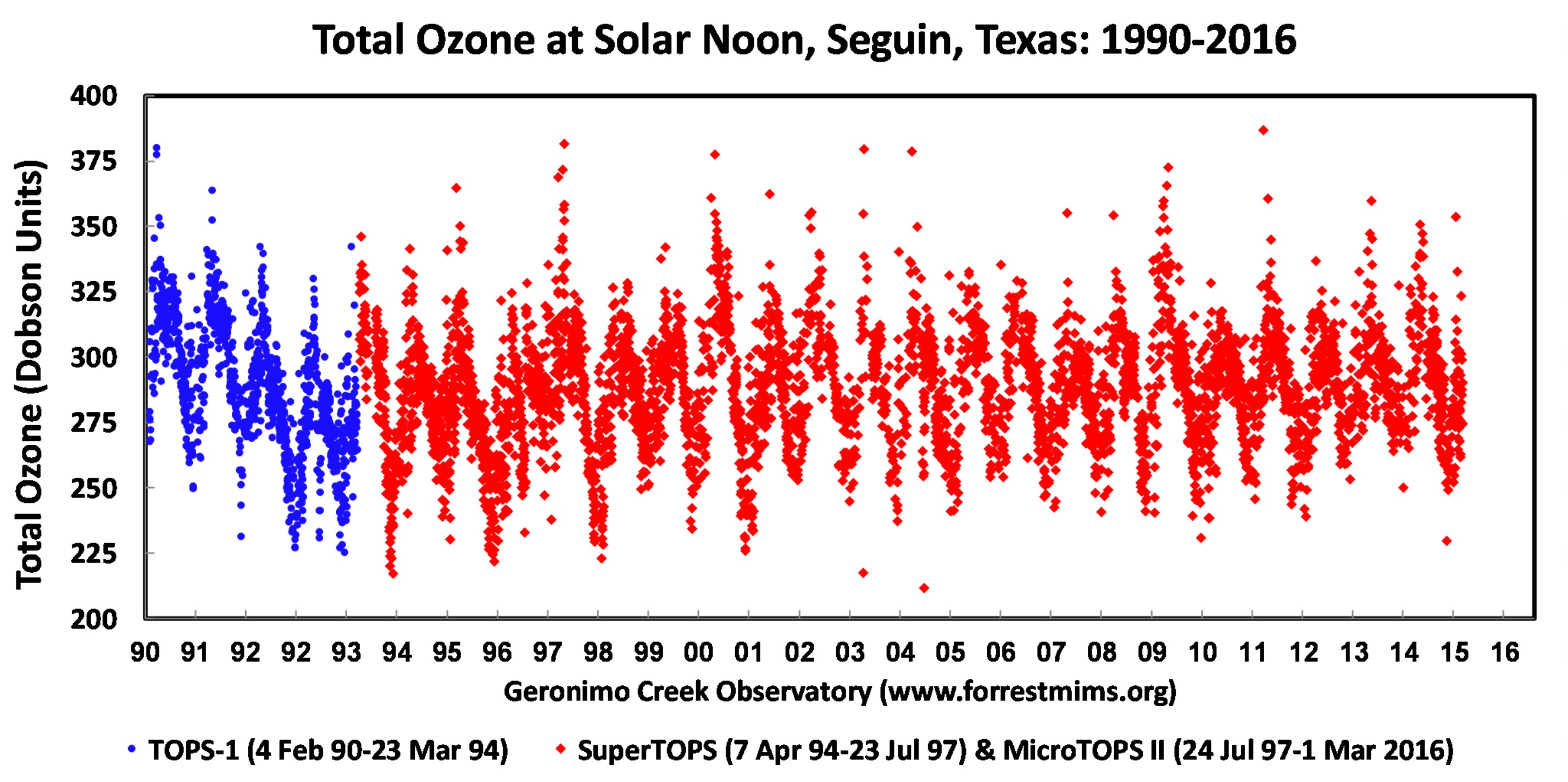
Total Ozone measured by Forrest M. Mims III at Geronimo Creek Observatory, Texas (1990-2016)

The chart at right shows the total ozone measured from 1990 through 2016.

Total ozone (Dobson units) measured at solar noon at Geronimo Creek Observatory since February 4, 1990. Measurements conducted only when sun is open and free of clouds. Mims has compared his measurements against Dobson 76 and Brewers 009 and 119 at the Mauna Loa Observatory each year since 1992.

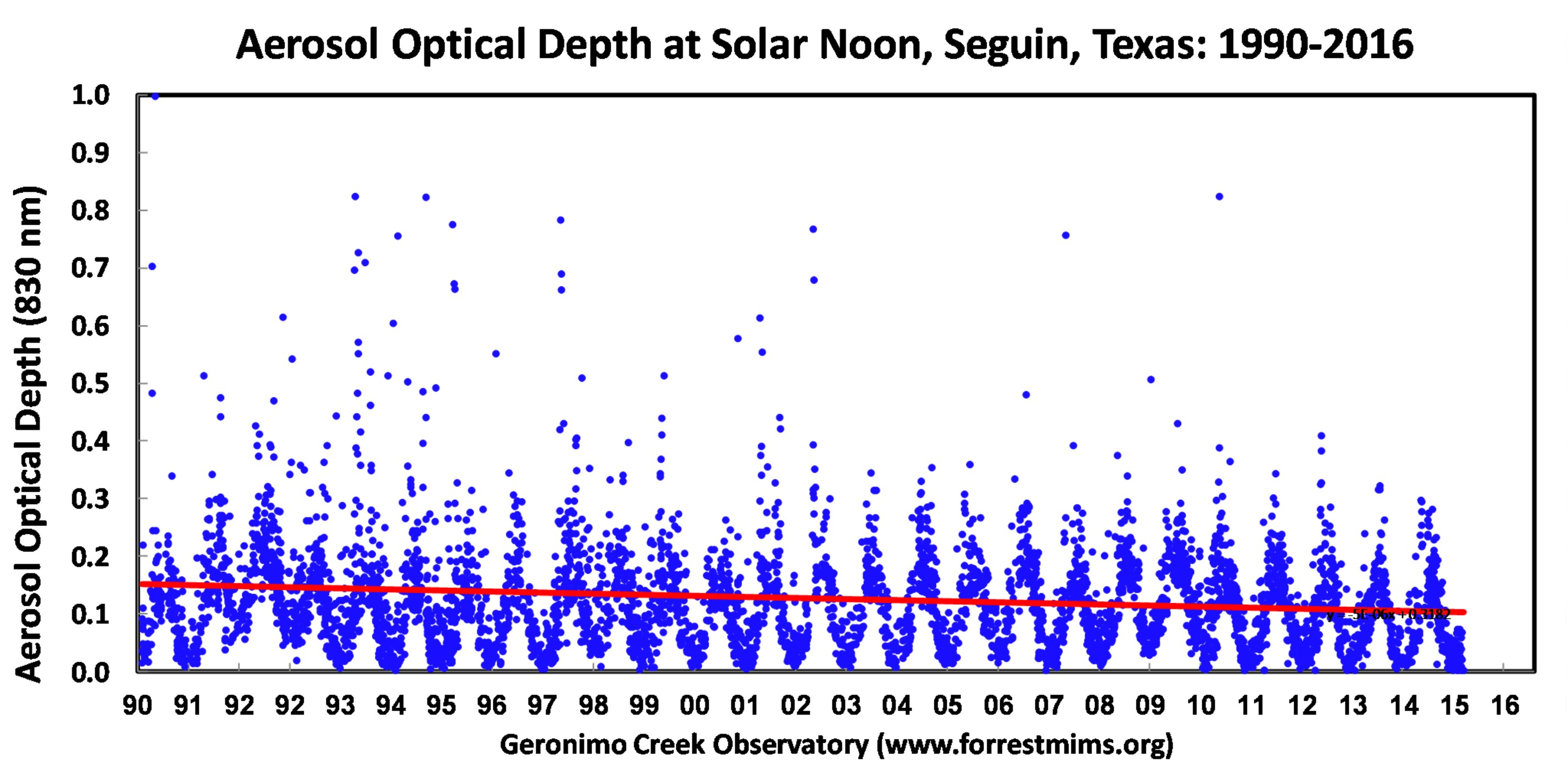
Aerosol Optical Depth (haze) at Geronimo Creek Observatory, Texas (1990-2016)

In addition to measuring total ozone, Mims has measured the aerosol optical depth (AOD) at 830 nm with his original instrument since 1990. The chart at left shows the data.

Measurements made at or near solar noon when the sun is not obstructed by clouds. Peaks indicate smoke, dust and smog. Saharan dust events are measured each summer.

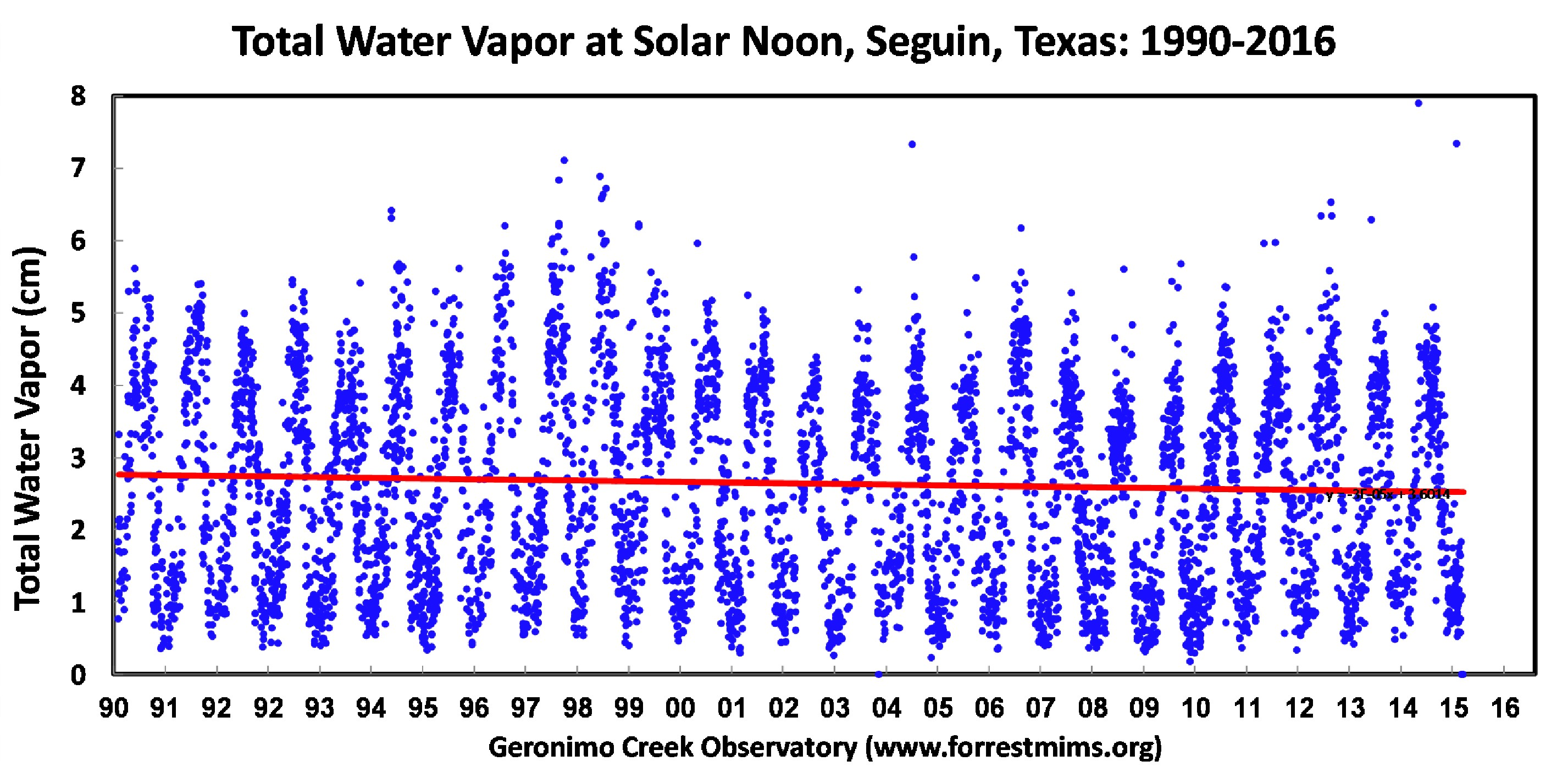
Total Column Water Vapor (Precipitable Water) measured at Geronimo Creek Observatory, Texas (1990-2016)

The chart at right shows the total column water vapor measured since 1990. Total column water vapor is measured at 940 nm and 830 nm (reference wavelength) using the same sun photometer first used on February 4, 1990.

The ratio of these two wavelengths provides the total water vapor. The trend is slightly down (approx. -1.5 mm/decade). Calibration: NOAA GPS data from Galveston, TX, and Mauna Loa Observatory, HI. Measurements are made at or near solar noon when clouds are not before the sun.

Water vapor is the key global warming gas. The 1997-98 peak in Mims's data occurred during a major El Nino. No such peak occurred during the 2015-16 El Nino. The general shape of the data resembles the global water vapor plot in NASA's ongoing NVAP study.

In addition to Mims's measurements in his home state of Texas, he made atmospheric measurements in Brazil during two three-week campaigns for NASA’s Goddard Space Flight Center. In August 1995, Mims led a 2-man team to measure the ozone layer during the SCAR-B campaign at Cuiaba in central Brazil since the ozone instrument aboard the Nimbus-7 satellite had ceased working.

In August 1997, Mims led a 2-man team that measured ozone layer, smoke optical depth, UV-B and water vapor near Alta Floresta in Amazonia.

During the fall of 1996, NASA’s Goddard Space Flight Center assigned Mims to fly at a moment's notice to a series of 7 major forest fires in Utah, California, Wyoming and Montana. A GSFC scientist had discovered that a new satellite ozone instrument could also detect smoke, and Mims was assigned to measure total ozone and the optical depth of smoke during satellite overpasses.

In 2022, the Bulletin of the American Meteorological Society published Mims 30 year paper on Climatology: "A 30-Year Climatology (1990–2020) of Aerosol Optical Depth and Total Column Water Vapor and Ozone over Texas." This time series now exceeds a similar measurement series at Table Mountain, California, by the Smithsonian Institution's Astrophysical Observatory (1926-1957).

== Twilight Science ==
Mims's latest research involves the measurement of the altitude of aerosol layers in the atmosphere using a new kind of twilight photometer.

A twilight photometer is a highly sensitive light meter that is pointed at the zenith sky for up to an hour after sunset or before sunrise. As the sun sets in the evening, the edge of Earth’s shadow over a fixed point rises overhead. (The opposite occurs before sunrise.) Particles in the sunlit atmosphere just above Earth’s shadow scatter sunlight toward the surface, where it can be detected by a twilight photometer. The elevation of these particles can be calculated.

Twilight photometry traditionally uses a telescope pointed toward the zenith that focuses very dim twilight onto a photodiode or photomultiplier tube connected to multi-stage amplifier. Mimss design is unique in that it employs an ordinary LED as a twilight detector and no external optics beyond the epoxy lens in which the LED chip is encapsulated.

Instead of a multi-stage amplifier, he uses a single operational amplifier with a feedback resistor of from 10 to 20 gigohms to provide a gain of 10 to 20 billion. Since 2013, Mims has used several LED twilight photometers to detect layers of smoke and dust in the troposphere and volcanic aerosols in the stratosphere. Sulfur dioxide from the 21-23 June 2019 volcanic eruption of Raikoke reached the stratosphere and covered much of the northern hemisphere with a veil of sulfuric acid aerosols. Mims's twilight photometry from Central Texas and lidar measurements from Hawaii indicated that the elevation of the densest portion of the veil reached 25 km (15 miles) and was typically 16-20 km (10 to 12 miles).

== Furthering science ==
Forrest Mims has participated in forming a science-focused team in his three children. Daughter Sarah used kite-held smoke-and-spore sampling to keep the collection high away from local ground and airs while verifying the remote conditioning of the wind. Forrest had participated in setting up a stand on the ground for sampling the winds, but Sarah wanted to remove local-air-and-ground influences.

== Books ==
List of books, booklets, manuals by Forrest Mims.

Radio Shack

- Introduction to Electronics (1972)
- Introduction to Transistors (1972)
- Transistor Projects, Volume 1 (1973)
- Transistor Projects, Volume 2 (1974)
- Transistor Projects, Volume 3 (1975)
- Transistor Projects, Volume 4 (1976)
- Integrated Circuit Projects, Volume 1 (1973)
- Integrated Circuit Projects, Volume 2 (1974)
- Integrated Circuit Projects, Volume 3 (1975)
- Integrated Circuit Projects, Volume 4 (1975)
- Integrated Circuit Projects, Volume 5 (1976)
- Integrated Circuit Projects, Volume 6 (1977)
- Electronics Music Projects (1977)
- Computer Circuits for Experimenters (1974)
- Semiconductor Projects, Volume 1 (1975)
- Semiconductor Projects, Volume 2 (1976)
- Security for Your Home (1974)
- Optoelectronic Projects (1975)
- Radio Shack Introduces the World of Computing (1977)
- Understanding Digital Computers (1979)
- Engineer's Notebook 1 (1979)
- Engineer's Notebook 2 (1982)
- Beginner's Guide to Personal Computers (1981)
- Getting Started in Electronics (1983)
- Engineer's Mini-Notebook: 555 Timer IC Projects (1984) *
- Engineer's Mini-Notebook: Op-Amps (1985)
- Engineer's Mini-Notebook: Optoelectronics (1985)
- Engineer's Mini-Notebook: Basic Semiconductor Circuits (1986)
- Engineer's Mini-Notebook: Digital Logic Circuits (1985)
- Engineer's Mini-Notebook: Formulas, Tables & Basic Circuits (1988)
- Engineer's Mini-Notebook: Schematic Symbols, Design and Testing (1988)
- Engineer's Mini-Notebook: Communication Projects (1985)
- Engineer's Mini-Notebook: Science Projects (1990)
- Engineer's Mini-Notebook: Environmental Projects (1995)
- Engineer's Mini-Notebook: Sensor Projects (1996)
- Engineer's Mini-Notebook: Magnets and Magnetic Sensor Projects (1998)
- Engineer's Mini-Notebook: Solar Cell Projects (1999)
- Electronics Learning Lab, Workbook 1 (2000)
- Electronics Learning Lab, Workbook 2 (2000)
- Electronic Sensors Lab (2001)
- Sun and Sky Monitoring Station (2003)

Other

- Model Rocket Telemetry (MITS, 1969)
- Semiconductor Diode Lasers (with Ralph Campbell, Sams, 1972)
- Light Emitting Diodes (Sams, 1973)
- LED Circuits and Projects (Sams, 1973)
- Electronic Calculators (with H. Edward Roberts, Sams, 1974)
- Optoelectronics (Sams, 1975)
- 816 Calculator Assembly Manual (MITS, 1970)
- Altair 8800 Operator's Manual (MITS, 1975)
- How to Protect Your CB Rig (Sams, 1976)
- Electronic Circuitbook 1, Project Construction (Sams, 1976)
- Electronic Circuitbook 5, LED Projects (Sams, 1976)
- Home Computers (Consumer Guide, 1978)
- Number Machines (David McKay, 1977)
- Lasers, the Incredible Light Machines (David McKay, 1977)
- What to Look for Before You Buy an Advanced Calculator (Hewlett-Packard, 1976)
- The Programming Book (Hewlett-Packard, 1976)
- The Beginner's Handbook of Electronics (with George Olsen, Prentice-Hall, 1980)
- Light-beam Communications (Sams, 1975)
- A Practical Introduction to Lightwave Communications (IEEE & Sams, 1982)
- 103 Projects for Electronics Experimenters (Tab, 1981)
- The Forrest Mims Circuit Scrapbook (McGraw-Hill, 1983)
- Reference Data for Radio Engineers (Major Contributor, ITT Publishing, 1975)
- The New American Academic Encyclopedia (Major Contributor, Arete, 1979)
- Law and the Writer (Contributor, Writer's Digest Books, 1978)
- Siliconnections (McGraw-Hill, 1985)
- The Computer Scientist (Osborne/McGraw-hill, 1985)
- VHS-1 Sun Photometer (TERC, 1996 and National Science Teachers Association, 1996)
- Fifty Years of Monitoring a Changing Atmosphere - The Story of Hawaii's Mauna Loa Observatory (University of Hawaii Press, 2010)
- Make: Forrest Mims' Science Experiments (Make, 2016)
- Maverick Scientist: My Adventures as an Amateur Scientist (Make, 2024)
