= Modern Electronics =

American magazine

- Modern Electronics, October 1984
- Editor-in-Chief: Art Salsberg
- Categories: Hobby magazines
- Frequency: Monthly
- Publisher: Richard Ross
- First issue: October 1984
- Final issue Number: March 1991; Vol. 8 Num. 3
- Company: Modern Electronics, Inc.
- Country: USA
- Based in: Hicksville, New York
- Language: English

Modern Electronics was a hobbyist magazine published from October 1984 to March 1991. It became Computer Craft in April 1991 and the name changed again to MicroComputer Journal in January 1994. Modern Electronics, Inc. was owned by CQ Communications, Inc, the publishers of CQ Amateur Radio.

Art Salsberg was Editor-in-Chief and Alexander W. Burawa was the Managing Editor. The contributing editors included Len Feldman, Glenn Hauser, Forrest Mims and Don Lancaster. Many members of the editorial staff had previously worked for Popular Electronics but left when that magazine was changed to Computers & Electronics. Here is how Art Salsberg described the new magazine.

Many of you probably know of me from my decade-long stewardship of Popular Electronics magazine, which changed its name and editorial philosophy last year to distance itself from active electronics enthusiasts who move fluidly across electronics and computer product areas. In a sense, then, Modern Electronics is the successor to the original concept of Popular Electronics …

== Earlier use of title ==
The title Modern Electronics was used by another magazine that ran from February to October 1978. It was published by the Coean Publishing Corporation of Port Washington New York. The publisher was Richard A Cowan and the editors were Anthony Curtis and Mort Walters. Coean Publishing did not register a trademark for the title Modern Electronics so it was available for Art Salsberg to use in 1984.
