= Comparison of HP graphing calculators =

Class of hand-held calculator

A graphing calculator is a class of hand-held calculator that is capable of plotting graphs and solving complex functions. While there are several companies that manufacture models of graphing calculators, Hewlett-Packard is a major manufacturer.

The following table compares general and technical information for Hewlett-Packard graphing calculators:

Model	Processor	Memory	Display	Input method	Stack	Programming languages	Computer algebra system	Character set	Sound	Connectivity	Power supply	Release year	Predecessors	Successors
HP Prime G2 (2AP18AA)	528 MHz NXP i.MX 6ULL MCIMX6Y2 (Cortex A7 core, ARMv7 architecture)	256 MB RAM, 512 MB flash	320×240 pixel 16-bit color multi-touch TFT LCD with backlight	Algebraic, Entry RPN	Fixed (128 level)	PPL	Xcas/Giac-based	Unicode	No	USB (Micro-AB) USB-OTG	USB-rechargeable 3.7 V/2000 mAh/7.4 Wh Li-Ion, USB	2018–present	HP Prime G1	None
HP Prime G1 (NW280AA, G8X92AA)	400 MHz Samsung S3C2416XH-40 (ARM926EJ core, ARMv5 architecture)	32 MB RAM, 256 MB flash	320×240 pixel 16-bit color multi-touch TFT LCD with backlight	Algebraic, Entry RPN	Fixed (128 level)	PPL	Xcas/Giac-based	Unicode	No	USB (Micro-AB) (USB-OTG only with G8X92AA model)	USB-rechargeable 3.7 V/1500 mAh/5.55 Wh Li-Ion (compatible: Samsung Galaxy S3 2200 mAh), USB	2013–2017	HP 39gII, (HP 50g)	HP Prime G2
HP 50g blue (NW240AA)	75 MHz (203 MHz) Samsung S3C2410A (ARM920T core, ARMv4T architecture)	512 KB RAM, 2 MB flash, expandable via 2 GB SD card	131×80 pixel monochrome LCD	Entry RPN, Algebraic	Dynamic	RPL, Algebraic RPL	Erable-based	8-bit RPL character set (with euro sign)	Buzzer	USB (Mini-B), IrDA, 1×4-pin 3.3 V TTL serial (RS-232 via active converter)	4×1.5 V (6 V) AAA, 1×3 V CR2032, USB	2009–2012	HP 50g (hp 49g+)	(HP Prime)
HP 50g black (F2229A)	75 MHz (203 MHz) Samsung S3C2410A (ARM920T core, ARMv4T architecture)	512 KB RAM, 2 MB flash, expandable via 2 GB SD card	131×80 pixel monochrome LCD	Entry RPN, Algebraic	Dynamic	RPL, Algebraic RPL	Erable-based	8-bit RPL character set (with euro sign)	Buzzer	USB (Mini-B), IrDA, 1×4-pin 3.3 V TTL serial (RS-232 via active converter)	4×1.5 V (6 V) AAA, 1×3 V CR2032, USB	2006–2015	hp 49g+	(HP Prime)
hp 49g+ (F2228A)	75 MHz (203 MHz) Samsung S3C2410X01 (ARM920T core, ARMv4T architecture)	512 KB RAM, 2 MB flash, expandable via 2 GB SD card	131×80 pixel monochrome LCD	Entry RPN, Algebraic	Dynamic	RPL, Algebraic RPL	Erable-based	8-bit RPL character set (with euro sign)	Buzzer	USB (Mini-B), IrDA	3×1.5 V (4.5 V) AAA, 1×3 V CR2032	2003–2006	HP 49G	HP 50g
HP 48gII (F2226A)	48 MHz (203 MHz) Samsung S3C2410X01 (ARM920T core, ARMv4T architecture)	128 KB RAM (256 KB RAM - 2007 model only), not flashable	131×64 pixel monochrome LCD	Entry RPN, Algebraic	Dynamic	RPL, Algebraic RPL	Erable-based	8-bit RPL character set (with euro sign)	Buzzer	(USB (Mini-B) - 2007 model only), IrDA, 1×4-pin 3.3 V TTL serial (RS-232 via active converter)	3×1.5 V (4.5 V) AAA (4×1.5 V (6 V) AAA - 2007 model only), 1×3 V CR2032, USB (2007 model only)	2003	HP 48G+	HP 49g+
HP 49G (F1633A, F1896A)	4 MHz Yorke (Saturn 1LT8 core)	512 KB RAM, 2 MB flash	131×64 pixel monochrome LCD	Entry RPN, Algebraic	Dynamic	RPL, Algebraic RPL	Erable-based	8-bit RPL character set (with euro sign)	Buzzer	2×5-pin RS-232	3×1.5 V (4.5 V) AAA	1999–2003	HP 48GX, HP 48G+	hp 49g+
HP 48G+ (F1630A, F1894A)	4 MHz Yorke (Saturn 1LT8 core)	128 KB RAM, not flashable	131×64 pixel monochrome LCD	Entry RPN	Dynamic	RPL	Rudimentary	8-bit RPL character set	Buzzer	1×4-pin RS-232, HP SIR	3×1.5 V (4.5 V) AAA	1998–2003	HP 48G	HP 49G
HP 48G	3.68-4 MHz Yorke (Saturn 1LT8 core)	32 KB RAM, not flashable	131×64 pixel monochrome LCD	Entry RPN	Dynamic	RPL	Rudimentary	8-bit RPL character set	Buzzer	1×4-pin RS-232, HP SIR	3×1.5 V (4.5 V) AAA	1993–2003	HP 48S	HP 48G+, HP 49G
HP 48GX (F1895A)	4 MHz Yorke (Saturn 1LT8 core)	128 KB RAM, expandable via 128 KB and 4 MB max. card slots, not flashable	131×64 pixel monochrome LCD	Entry RPN	Dynamic	RPL	Rudimentary	8-bit RPL character set	Buzzer	1×4-pin RS-232, HP SIR	3×1.5 V (4.5 V) AAA	1993–2003	HP 48SX	HP 49G
HP 48S	2 MHz Clarke (Saturn 1LT8 core)	32 KB RAM, not flashable	131×64 pixel monochrome LCD	Entry RPN	Dynamic	RPL	Rudimentary	8-bit RPL character set	Buzzer	1×4-pin RS-232, HP SIR	3×1.5 V (4.5 V) AAA	1991–1993	HP-28S	HP 48G
HP 48SX	2 MHz Clarke (Saturn 1LT8 core)	32 KB RAM, expandable via 2 card slots of 128 KB RAM/ROM each, not flashable	131×64 pixel monochrome LCD	Entry RPN	Dynamic	RPL	Rudimentary	8-bit RPL character set	Buzzer	1×4-pin RS-232, HP SIR	3×1.5 V (4.5 V) AAA	1990–1993	HP-28S	HP 48GX
HP 39gII (NW249AA)	80 MHz Freescale (formerly SigmaTel) STMP3770 (ARM926EJ-S core)	256 KB RAM (ca. 240 KB available to user), 128 MB flash (80–105 MB available to user)	256×128 pixel monochrome gray-scale LCD	Algebraic	Dynamic	HP Basic-variant or PPL-predecessor?	No	Unicode	No	USB-OTG (Micro-AB)	1–4×1.5 V (1.5 V) AAA, USB	2011	HP 39gs	HP Prime
HP 40gs (F2225A)	75 MHz Samsung S3C2410A (ARM920T core, ARMv4T architecture)	256 KB RAM, 2 MB flash	131×64 pixel monochrome LCD	Algebraic	Dynamic	HP Basic	Erable-based	8-bit RPL character set (with ^{−1} and euro sign)	Buzzer	USB (Mini-B), 1×4-pin 3.3 V TTL serial (RS-232 via active converter)	4×1.5 V (6 V) AAA, 1×3 V CR2032, USB	2006–2011	HP 40G	HP 39gII, HP Prime
HP 39gs (F2223A)	75 MHz Samsung S3C2410A (ARM920T core, ARMv4T architecture)	256 KB RAM, 1 MB flash	131×64 pixel monochrome LCD	Algebraic	Dynamic	HP Basic	No	8-bit RPL character set (with ^{−1} and euro sign)	Buzzer	USB (Mini-B), IrDA, 1×4-pin 3.3 V TTL serial (RS-232 via active converter)	4×1.5 V (6 V) AAA, 1×3 V CR2032, USB	2006–2011	hp 39g+	HP 40gs, HP 39gII
hp 39g+ (F2224A)	75 MHz Samsung S3C2410X (ARM920T core, ARMv4T architecture)	256 KB RAM, 1 MB flash	131×64 pixel monochrome LCD	Algebraic	Dynamic	HP Basic	No	8-bit RPL character set (with ^{−1} and euro sign)	Buzzer	USB (Mini-B), IrDA	3×1.5 V (4.5 V) AAA, 1×3 V CR2032	2003–2006	HP 39G	HP 39gs
HP 40G (F1907A)	4 MHz Yorke (Saturn 1LT8 core)	256 KB RAM, not flashable	131×64 pixel monochrome LCD	Algebraic	Dynamic	HP Basic	Erable-based	8-bit RPL character set (with ^{−1} and euro sign)	Buzzer	2×5-pin RS-232	3×1.5 V (4.5 V) AAA	2000–2003	HP 38G	HP 40gs
HP 39G (F1906A)	4 MHz Yorke (Saturn 1LT8 core)	256 KB RAM, not flashable	131×64 pixel monochrome LCD	Algebraic	Dynamic	HP Basic	No	8-bit RPL character set (with ^{−1} and euro sign)	Buzzer	IrDA, 2×5-pin RS-232	3×1.5 V (4.5 V) AAA	2000–2003	HP 38G	hp 39g+
HP 38G (F1200A, F1892A)	4 MHz Yorke (Saturn 1LT8 core)	32 KB RAM, not flashable	4-line (131×64 pixel) monochrome LCD	Algebraic	Dynamic	HP Basic	No	8-bit RPL character set	Buzzer	HP SIR, 2×5-pin RS-232	3×1.5 V (4.5 V) AAA	1995	None	HP 39G, HP 40G
HP-28S	1 MHz Lewis (Saturn 1LR2 core)	32 KB RAM, not flashable	4-line (137×32 pixel) monochrome LCD	Entry RPN	Dynamic	RPL	Rudimentary	8-bit HP Roman 8 variant	Buzzer	HP SIR	3×1.5 V (4.5 V) N	1988–1992	HP-28C	HP 48 series
HP-28C	640 kHz Saturn (Saturn 1LK7 core)	2 KB RAM, 1709? bytes RAM available for user, not flashable	4-line (137×32 pixel) monochrome LCD	Entry RPN	Dynamic	RPL	Rudimentary	8-bit HP Roman 8 variant	Buzzer	HP SIR	3×1.5 V (4.5 V) N	1987–1988	HP-41C	HP-28S
HP-42S	1 MHz Lewis (Saturn core)	8 KB RAM (extensible to 32 KB), 7200? (or 31553) bytes RAM available for user, not flashable	2-line (131×16 pixel) monochrome LCD	Classical RPN	Fixed (4 level)	Keystroke programmable, fully merged (FOCAL variant)	None	8-bit proprietary	Buzzer	HP SIR	3×1.5 V (4.5 V) LR44	1987–1995	HP-41C, (HP-15C)	HP-28S
HP 9g	Sunplus SPLB30A (aka Generalplus GPLB30A)	712? bytes RAM available for user, not flashable	35×23 pixel, 1-line 5-digit 5×7 dot matrix, 1-line 10+3-digit 7-segment monochrome LCD	Algebraic	?	Limited, 10 programmable "expression registers" that can reference other functions, registers, and memory	No	?	No	None	1×3 V CR2025	2003	None	None
Model	Processor	Memory	Display	Input method	Stack	Programming languages	Computer algebra system	Character set	Sound	Connectivity	Power supply	Release year	Predecessors	Successors

== See also ==
- Comparison of Texas Instruments graphing calculators
- Casio graphic calculators
- HP calculators
- List of Hewlett-Packard pocket calculators
