= HP Prime =

Programmable graphing calculator

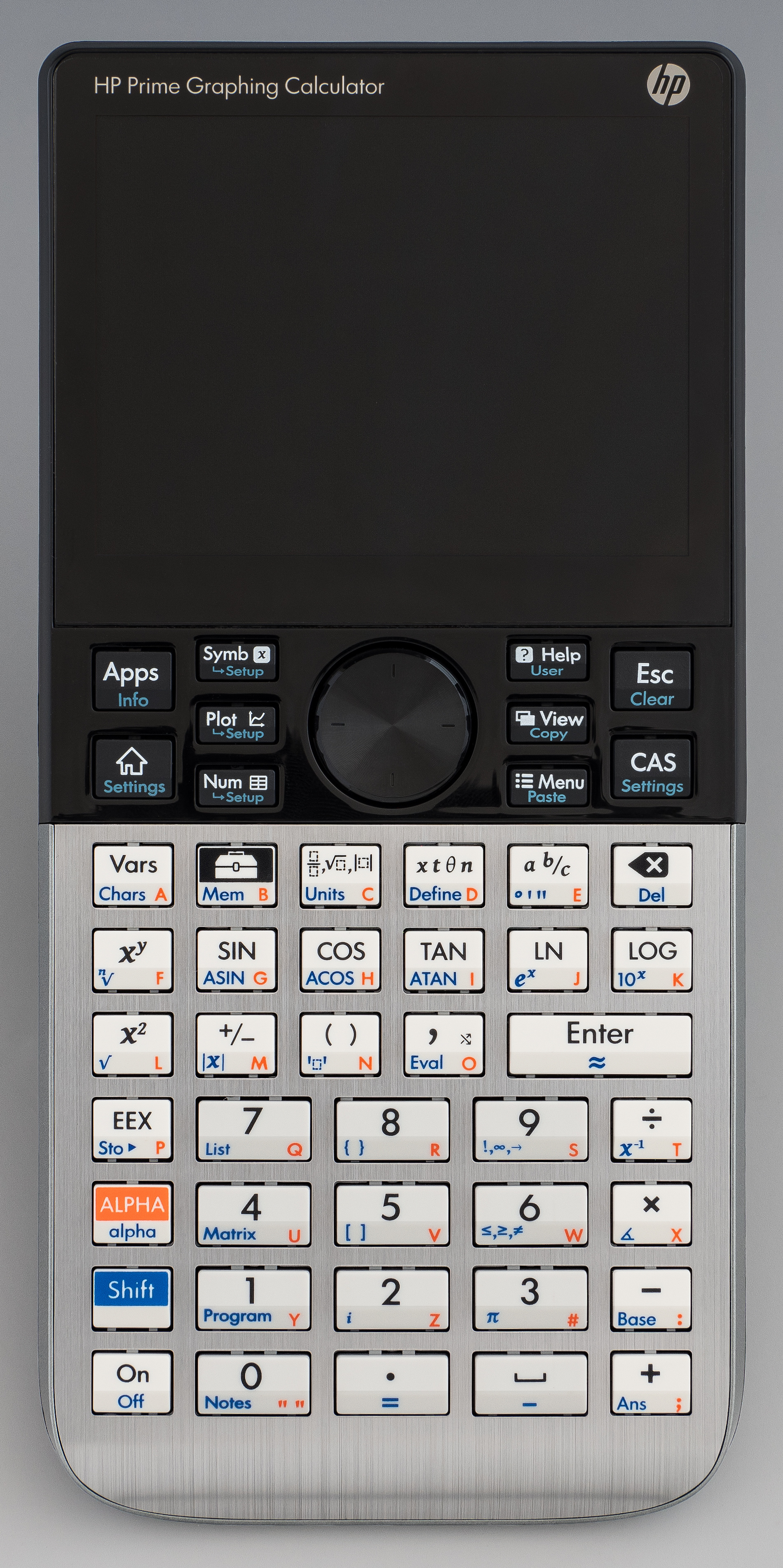
- Type: CAS, Graphing, Programmable, Scientific
- Manufacturer: Hewlett-Packard (2013–2015); HP Inc. (2015–2021); Moravia Consulting & Royal Consumer Information Products (2022–present)
- Introduced: October 2013
- Latest firmware: 2.4 15515 (2025-09-17)
- Predecessor: HP 39gII (HP 50g)

Calculator
- Entry mode: Textbook / Algebraic / Advanced RPN
- Display type: 16-bit full-color multi-touch TFT LCD
- Display size: 320×240 pixels (3.5-inch / 8.9 cm diagonal), text 10×33 (lines × characters) + menus + header

CPU
- Processor: G1: 400 MHz Samsung S3C2416XH-40 (ARM926EJ-S core); G2: 528 MHz NXP i.MX 6ULL MCIMX6Y2 (Cortex A7 core)

Programming
- Programming language(s): HP PPL & Python (in beta testing)
- User memory: G1: 32 MiB DDR3 SDRAM, 256 MB Flash; G2: 256 MiB DDR3 SDRAM, 512 MB Flash

Interfaces
- Ports: Micro USB-AB connector

Other
- Weight: 228 g (8.04 oz)
- Dimensions: 18.23×8.58×1.39 cm (7.13×3.38×0.550 inches)

The HP Prime Graphing Calculator is a graphing calculator introduced by Hewlett-Packard in 2013 and manufactured by HP Inc. until the licensees Moravia Consulting spol. s r.o. and Royal Consumer Information Products, Inc. took over the continued development, manufacturing, distribution, marketing and support in 2022. Unlike with most graphing calculators, the HP Prime was designed with features resembling those of smartphones, such as a rechargeable lithium-ion battery, full-color touchscreen display, and a user interface centered around different applications. It claims to be the world's smallest and thinnest CAS-enabled calculator currently available.

The functionality of the HP Prime is also available as emulation software for PCs and Macs, as well as for various smartphones.

== Design and software ==
The HP Prime's graphical user interface features two separate home screens, one of which contains an integrated computer algebra system (CAS) based on the free and open-source Xcas/Giac 1.5.0 engine, which evolved from that of the HP 49G and its successors. Both the standard and CAS modes function independently of each other and the calculator can quickly switch between the two, unlike some of its competitors, such as the TI-Nspire series by Texas Instruments, which comes in either CAS-supported models or non-CAS models.

The G1 model calculator has a 1,500 mAh battery, which is expected to last up to 15 hours on a single charge. The G2 model comes with a battery with a capacity of 2,000 mAh.

Unlike the HP 50g and its predecessors, the HP Prime does not have an SD card slot and does not feature a beeper.

=== Exam Mode ===
The HP Prime has a feature called Exam Mode. This enables various features of the calculator (such as CAS functionality, user-created apps, notes, etc.) to be selectively disabled for a specific time, from 15 minutes to 8 hours. This can be done manually within the calculator's menus, or by using a computer with HP's connectivity software. LEDs on the top of the calculator blink to let the instructor see that the calculator is in this mode. Despite this feature, the Prime is still prohibited in many examinations, such as the US's ACT college-entry test. It is however starting to be accepted in other examinations, like those run by the Dutch CvTE, the Swiss IB, or Alberta (Canada) education authorities.

=== Programming ===
The HP Prime's non-CAS home-screen supports textbook, algebraic and 128-level RPN (aka Advanced RPN) entry logic. Unlike RPL, which throws an error message when its dynamic stack is exhausted, the Prime's fixed-sized stack just drops values off the stack on overflow (like with four-level RPN). The calculator uses a new operating system unrelated to HP's legacy Saturn and Saturn-emulated systems, which were used on HP's previous RPN/RPL graphing calculators; therefore, it is not compatible with any User RPL or System RPL, or with programming in Saturn or ARM assembler language.

The calculator supports programming in a new, Pascal-like programming language now named HP PPL (for Prime Programming Language, but originally also referred to as HP Basic) that also supports creating apps. This is based on a language introduced on the HP 38G and built on in subsequent models.

== Hardware revisions and model variants ==
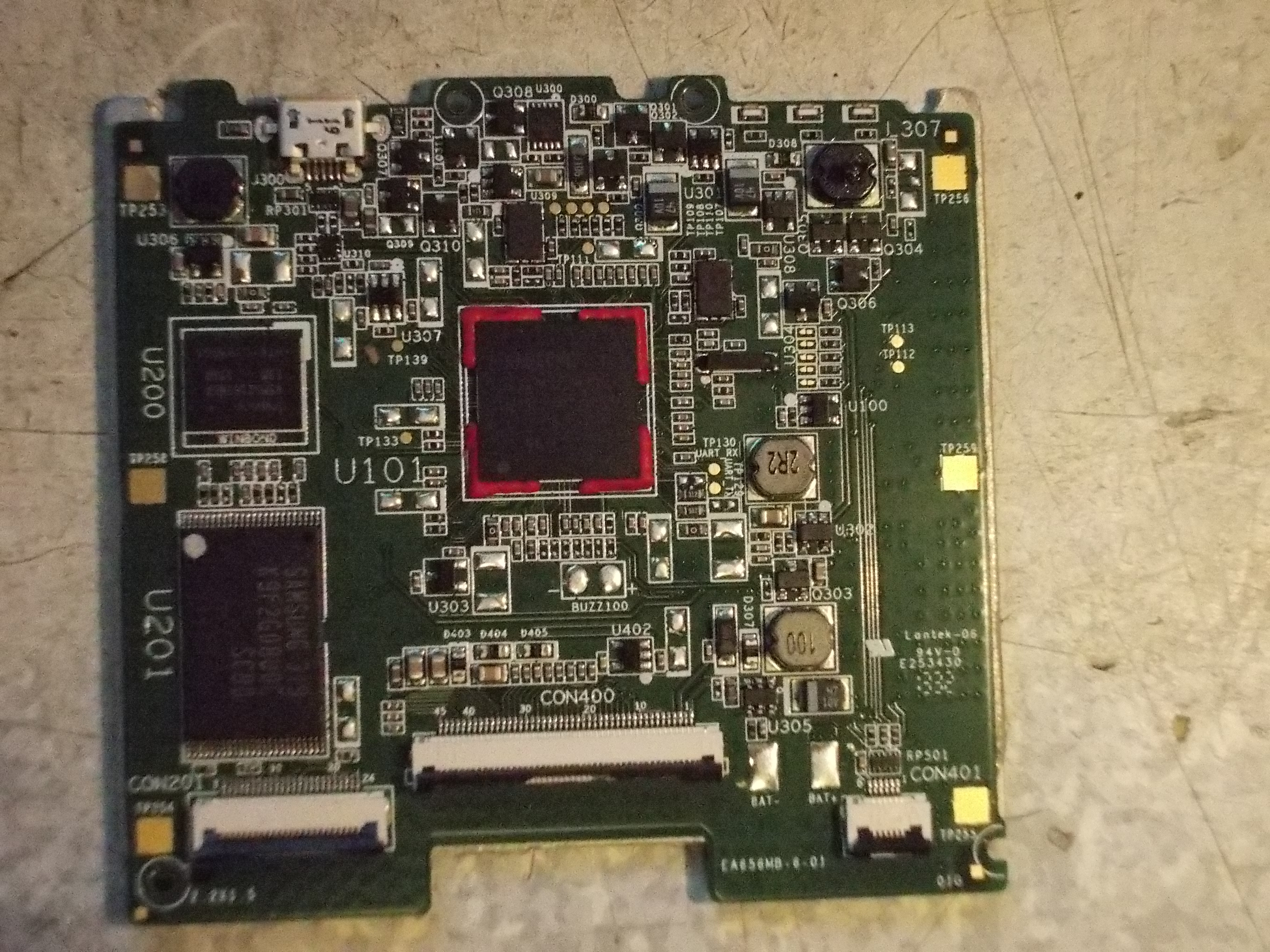
Motherboard of the NW280AA model

The first production model (NW280AA) in 2013 reports its hardware revision as A. This model does not support wireless connectivity, unit-to-unit USB communication, or data streaming. The calculator is manufactured by Inventec Besta and utilizes a modified version of their Besta operating system.

The second production model (G8X92AA) reports its hardware revision as C. It was introduced in May 2014. This model supports features lacking in the first production model, namely wireless connectivity (using the HP Prime Wireless Kit (FOK65AA)), unit-to-unit USB communication (through USB OTG), and data streaming (using the HP StreamSmart 410 (NW278AA) 4-port data streamer). The wireless kit includes a base station connected to a PC and wireless modules to connect to up to 30 HP Prime calculators for use in a classroom.

The third production model, which was introduced in August 2016, has a revised color scheme with darker blue and orange colors for an improved readability of the keyboard. It still carries the model number G8X92AA and reports a hardware revision of C, but the package shows a 2016 copyright.

In July 2018, HP introduced a new hardware generation with model number 2AP18AA and hardware revision D. This version features an NXP i.MX 6ULL MCIMX6Y2 processor with ARM Cortex A7 core and is about three times faster. It provides more RAM (256 MiB instead of 32 MiB) and a bigger Flash module (512 MB instead of 256 MB) and runs FreeRTOS. It is labelled "G2" on the back.

== Images ==
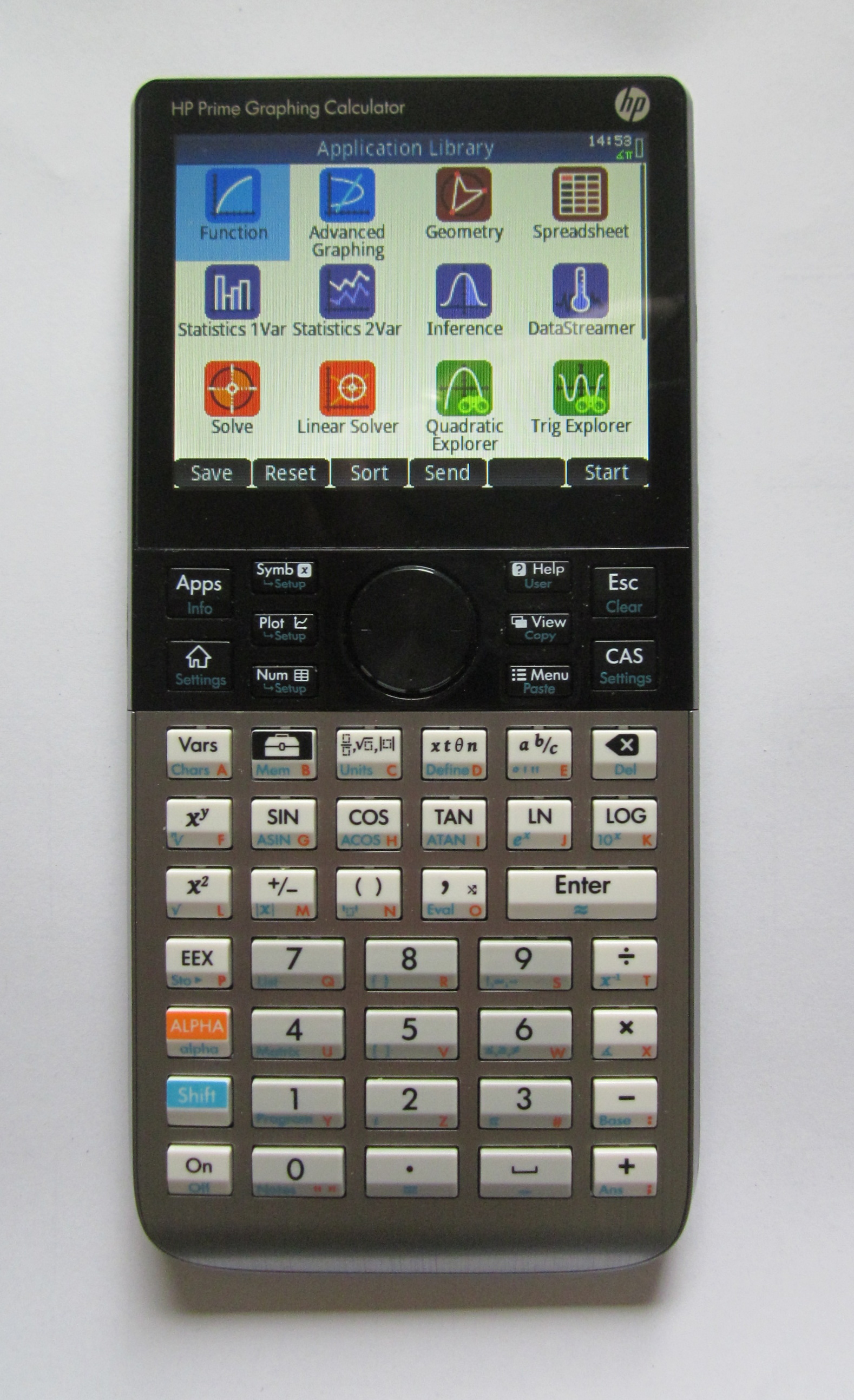
Selection of bundled apps (G1 Model)

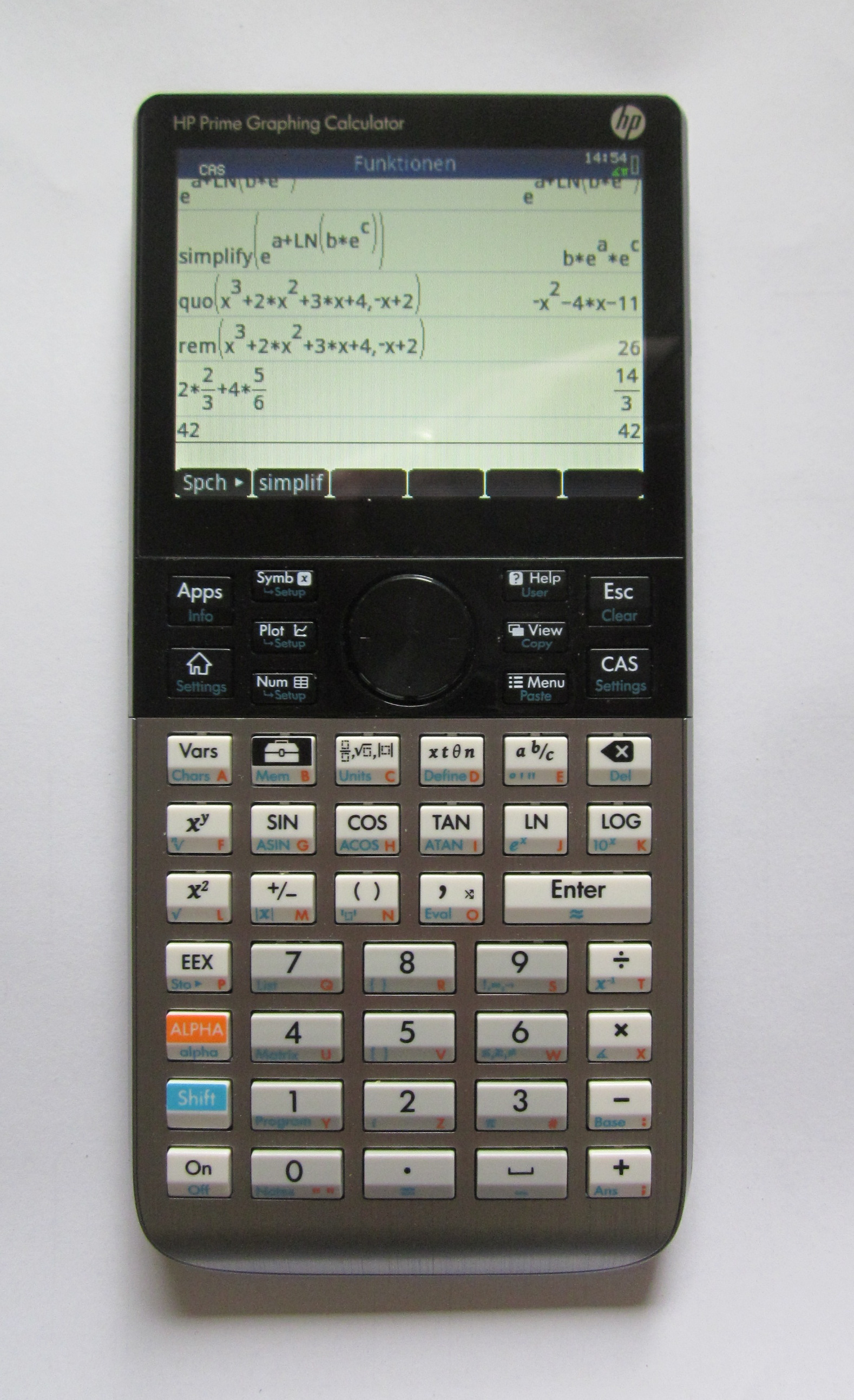
Computer Algebra System (G1 Model)

== See also ==
- Comparison of HP graphing calculators
- HP calculators
- List of Hewlett-Packard products
- DB48X (RPL for HP Prime)
