= HP CAS =

HP CAS may refer to:

- Erable, a computer algebra system integrated into the HP 40/49/50 series of Hewlett-Packard scientific calculators
- Xcas/Giac, a computer algebra system integrated into the HP Prime scientific calculator
