= ARPL =

ARPL may refer to:

- ARPL (opcode), an x86 instruction introduced with Intel 80286
- ARPL (programming language), a calculator programming language by Hewlett-Packard
