= Erable =

Computer algebra system for Hewlett-Packard graphing calculators

- Developers: Bernard Parisse, Mika Heiskanen, Claude-Nicolas Fiechter
- Initial release: 1993; 32 years ago
- Stable release: 4.20060919 (2006-09-19) / 2009-04-21/2012-04-26
- Written in: System RPL
- Type: Computer algebra system
- License: LGPL
- Website: www-fourier.ujf-grenoble.fr/~parisse/english.html#hpcalc

Erable is a computer algebra system (CAS) for a family of Hewlett-Packard graphing scientific calculators of the HP 40, 48 and HP 49/50 series.

== History ==
Originally named ALGB in 1993, it was developed by the French mathematician Bernard Parisse for the HP 48SX. Over time, the system integrated a lot of functionality from another math pack for the HP 48 series, ALG48 by Mika Heiskanen and Claude-Nicolas Fiechter. At some point, ALGB was renamed into Erable, a French play-on-words on another CAS named Maple. Compatible with the HP 48S, 48SX, 48G, 48GX, and 48G+, Erable became one of the "must-have" software packages to be installed by advanced users of these calculators.

When Hewlett-Packard developed the HP 49G in 1999, the Erable and ALG48 packages became an integral part of the calculator's firmware, now just named HP49 CAS.

As HP CAS it also showed up in the HP 40G, 40gs, 49g+, 48gII and 50g and was maintained by Parisse up to 2006.

Based on his experiences with Erable, Parisse started developing a new and more general CAS system named Xcas / Giac in 2000. It is written in C++ rather than System RPL. This system was integrated into the HP Prime in 2013 under a dual-license scheme.

== Versions ==
The last stable stand-alone version of Erable for the HP 48 series is 3.024 (1998-08-06), with source code as of 1998-07-14 available under the GNU GPL. The latest beta versions for these calculators are 3.117 (1998-10-17) and 3.201 (1999-02-07).

Parts of the CAS system for the HP 49/50 series (version 4) were released as open-source under the LGPL (since some parts of the CAS, which are copyrighted by Hewlett-Packard, remain proprietary software) and were maintained by Parisse up to 2006-02-02 (for firmware 2.14), and 2006-09-19 (for firmware 2.15 (2009-04-21) and 2.16 (2012-04-26)).

== See also ==
- Comparison of computer algebra systems
