= HP 39/40 series =

Series of graphing calculator by Hewlett-Packard

HP 39/40 series are graphing calculators from Hewlett-Packard, the successors of HP 38G. The series consists of six calculators, which all have algebraic entry modes, and can perform numeric analysis together with varying degrees of symbolic calculation. All calculators in this series are aimed at high school level students and are characterized by their ability to download (via cable or infrared) APLETs or E-lessons. These are programs of varying complexity which are generally intended to be used in the classroom to enhance the learning of mathematics by the graphical and/or numerical exploration of concepts.

== HP 39g ==
The HP 39g (F1906A) was released in 2000.

Basic characteristics:

- CPU: 4 MHz Yorke (Saturn core)
- Communication: Proprietary infrared, serial RS-232 (serial port).
- Memory: 256 KB RAM
- Screen resolution: 131 × 64 pixels
- Includes a hard cover
- Limited symbolic equation functionality.

== HP 40g ==
HP 40g (F1907A) was released in 2000 in parallel with the HP 39g. The HP 40g's operating system is identical to the HP 39g. Differences detected in hardware during start-up trigger the differences in software functionality.

The hardware is identical to the HP 49G/39G series (complete with rubber keyboard). In contrast to the 39g, it integrates the same computer algebra system (CAS) also found in the HP 49G, HP CAS. Unlike its "bigger brothers", the HP 40g has no flags to set/mis-set resulting in a "better behaved" calculator for straightforward math analysis. Additionally the HP 40g does not have infrared connectivity, and is limited to 27 variables. A list-based solver, and other handicaps make this simple-to-use calculator less adapted to higher end use. The HP 40g is not allowed for use in many standardized tests including the ACT. It is allowed on the SAT as of 2019, however.

Basic characteristics:

- Identical to HP 39g except:
- Communication: No infrared communication, serial RS-232 (serial port).
- Software: Includes an equation writer and advanced CAS.

== HP 39g+ ==
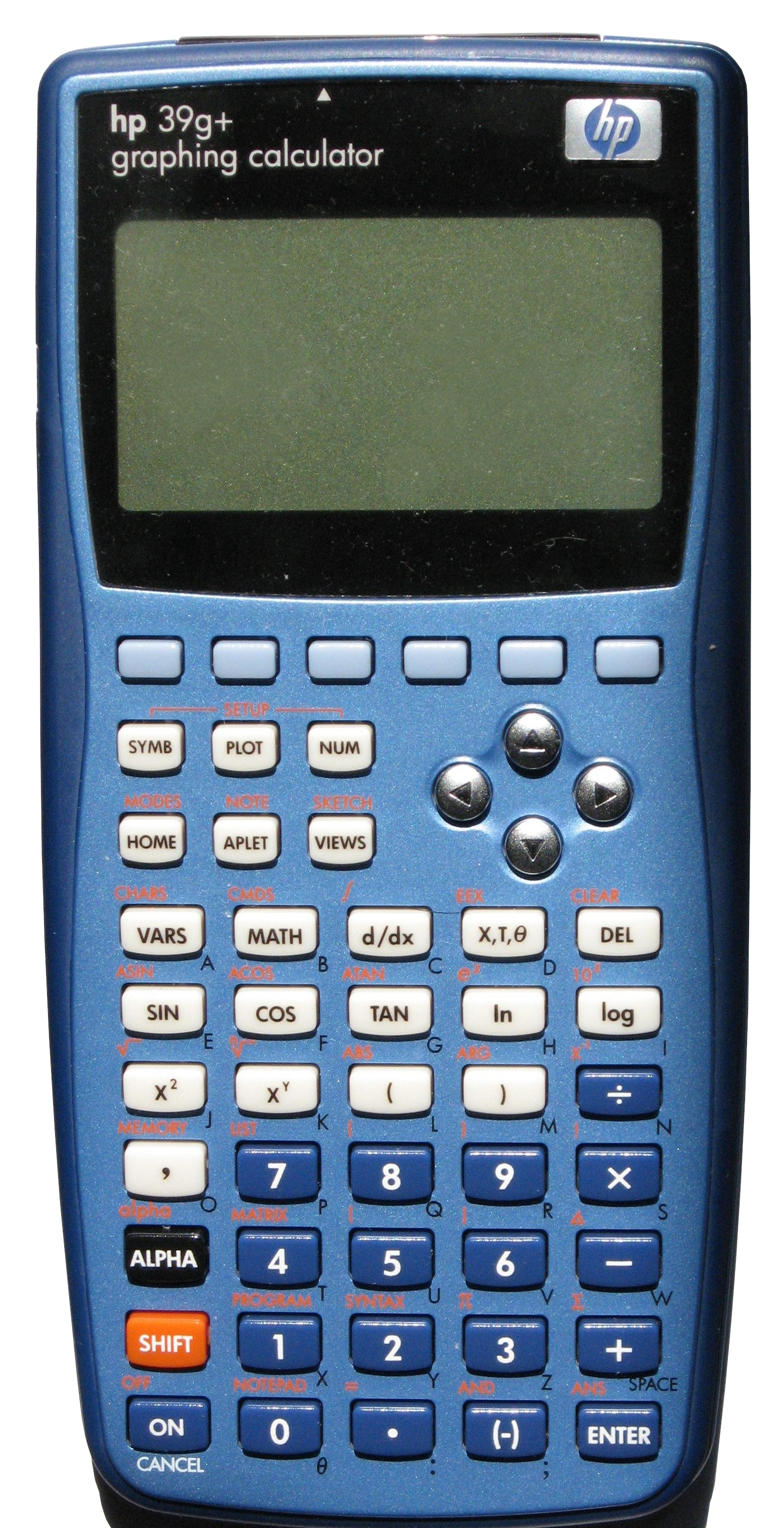
HP 39g+

The HP 39g+ (F2224A) was released in September 2003.

Basic characteristics:

- CPU: 75 MHz Samsung S3C2410X (ARM920T core)
- Memory: 256 KB RAM, 1 MB flash
- Communication: USB Mini-B port (using the Kermit or XModem protocols), IrDA (infrared).
- Power: 3 × AAA as main power, CR2032 for memory backup
- Screen resolution: 131×64 pixels
- Does not come with a hard cover
- Limited symbolic equation functionality.

Note: Although an ARM processor is used in this model, the operating system is substantially the same as that of the 39G, with the Saturn chip being emulated on the ARM at a higher speed than was possible for the 39G. The CAS component of the HP 40G's operating system appears to have been totally removed, rather than simply being hidden at start-up.

== HP 39gs ==
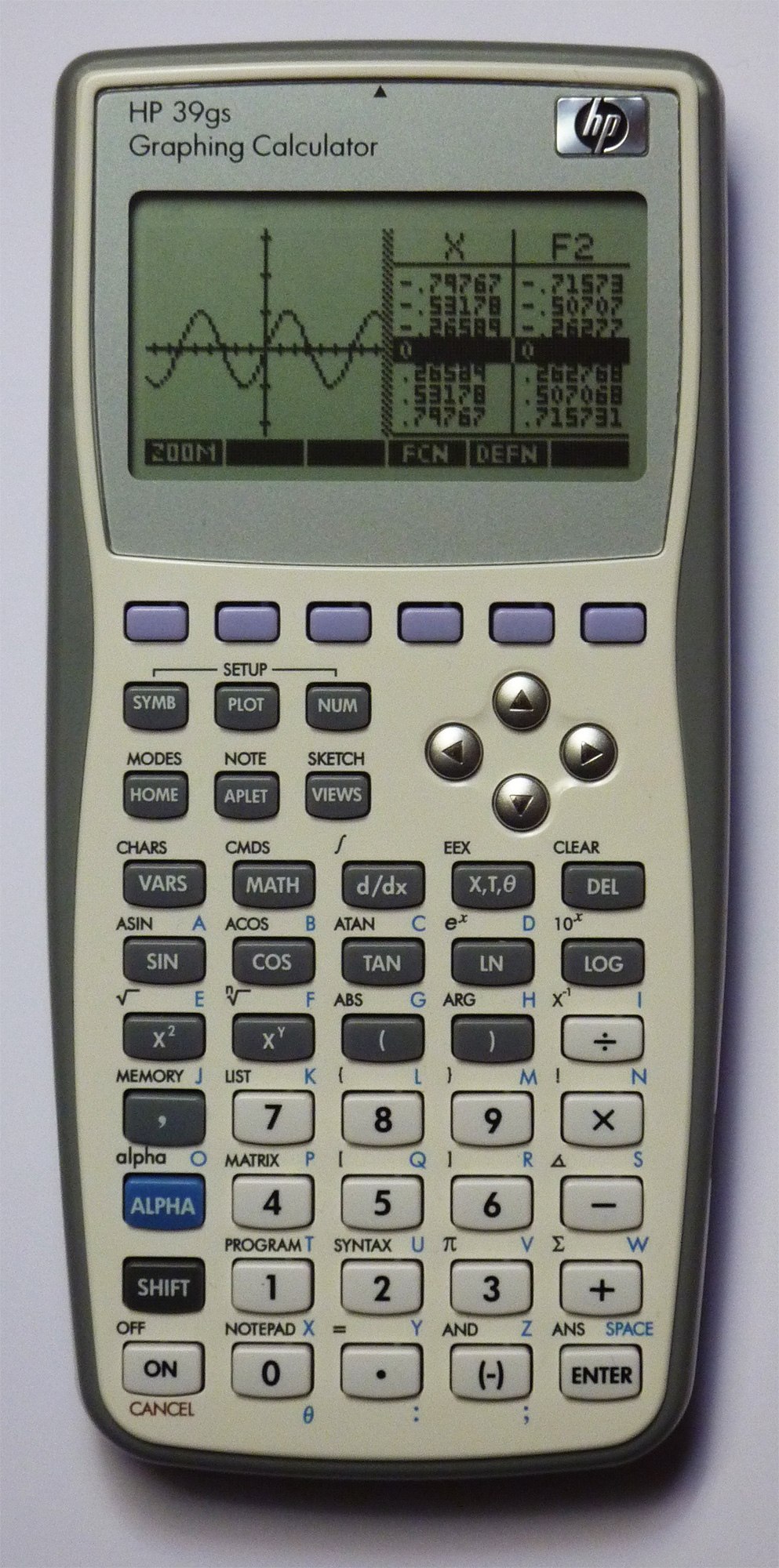
HP 39gs

The HP 39gs (F2223A) was released in June 2006.

Basic characteristics:

- CPU: 75 MHz Samsung S3C2410A (ARM920T core)
- Memory: 256 KB RAM, 1 MB flash
- Communication: USB Mini-B port (using the Kermit or XModem protocols), IrDA (infrared), 4-pin asynchronous 3.3 V TTL serial port (RS-232 via active converter).
- Power: 4×AAA as main power, CR2032 for memory backup
- Screen resolution: 131×64 pixels
- Includes a hard cover
- Limited symbolic equation functionality.
- Flash memory to allow potential future upgrades/bug fixes.

Note: Although an ARM processor is used in this model the operating system is substantially the same as that of the 39G, with the Saturn chip being emulated on the ARM at a higher speed than was possible for the 39G.

== HP 40gs ==
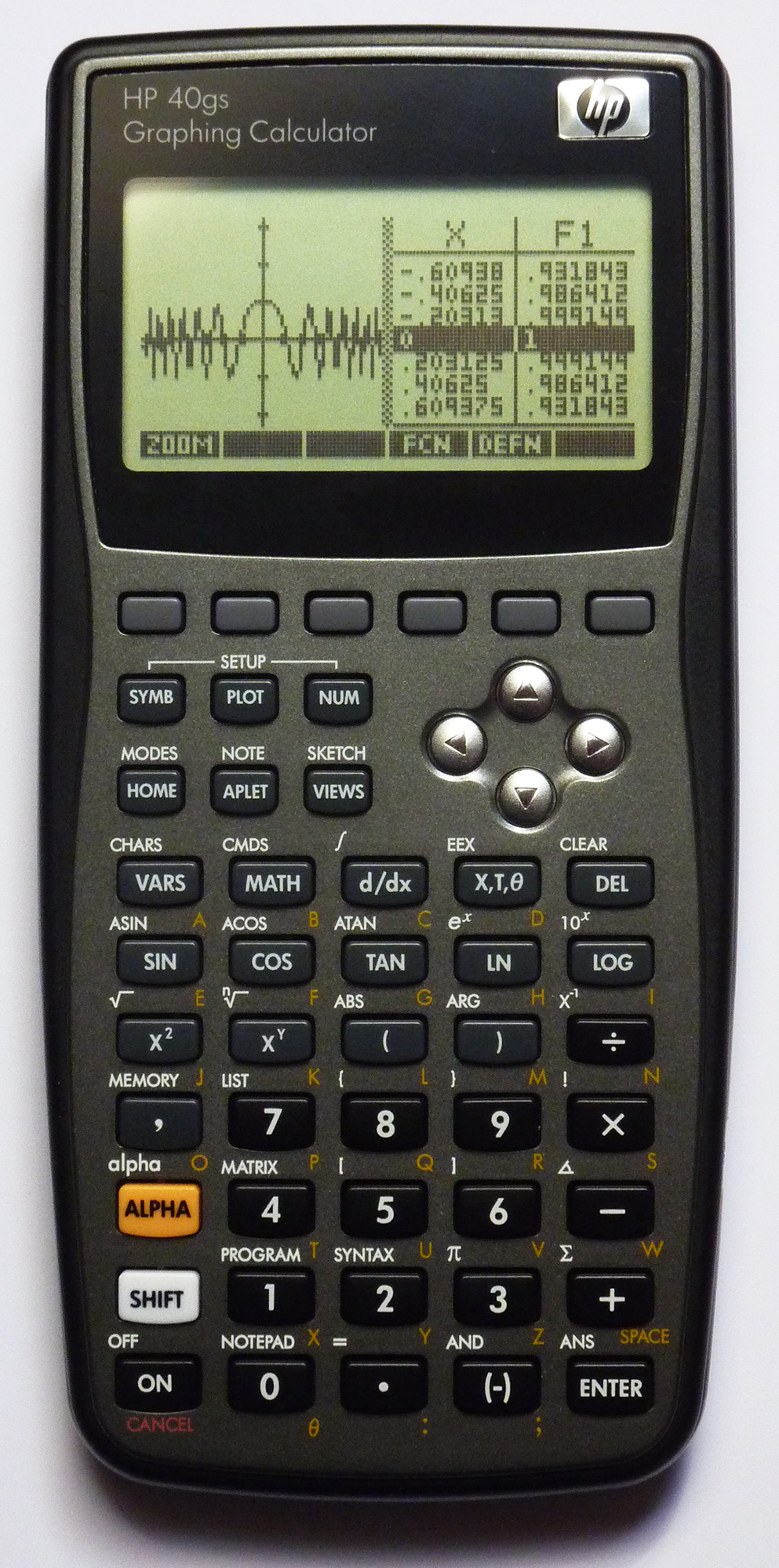
HP 40gs

The HP 40gs (F2225A) was released in mid-2006.

Basic characteristics:

- CPU: 75 MHz Samsung S3C2410A (ARM920T core)
- Identical to HP 39gs except:
- Memory: 256 KB RAM, 2 MB flash. Flash memory is larger to accommodate the CAS software.
- Communication: No infrared communication.
- Software: Includes an equation writer and advanced CAS.

== HP 39gII ==
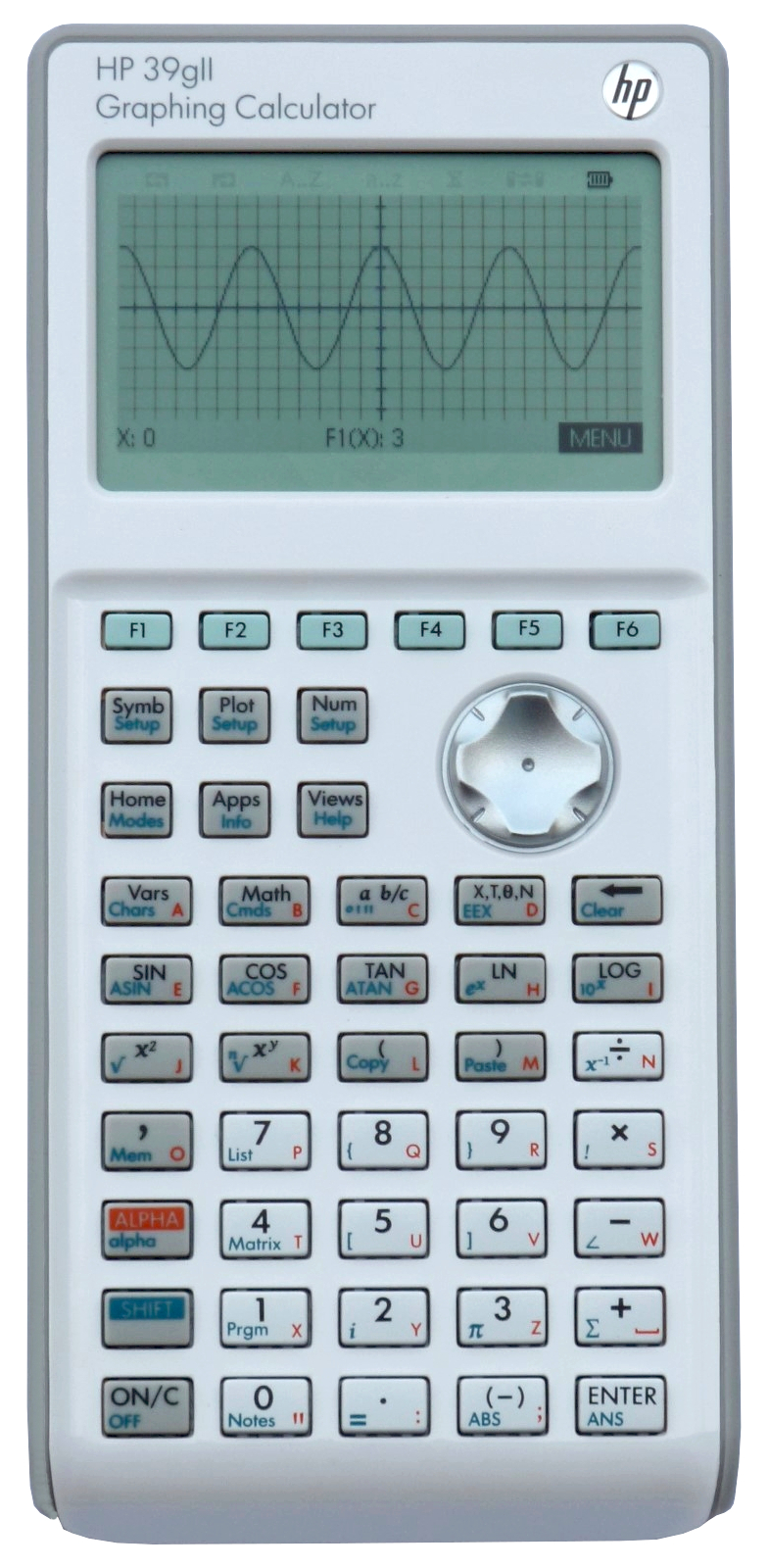
HP 39gII

The HP 39gII (NW249AA) was released in October 2011. It is built around an 80 MHz Freescale (formerly SigmaTel) STMP3770 processor with ARM926EJ-S core and features 256 KB RAM and 128 MB flash memory (of which ca. 240 KB RAM and 80–105 MB flash are available to users). The high-resolution monochrome gray-scale LCD provides 256×128 pixels. Connectivity is provided through a USB-OTG Micro-AB connector. The BCD math libraries internally used by the calculator were rewritten in platform-independent C code run natively rather than System RPL code executed in an emulator. The Pascal-like programming language supported by the calculator is a predecessor of the HP Prime's HP PPL. The calculator is the first to support a 128-level stack and Unicode (UTF-16). Two variants with slightly different labeling of the a b/c key exist.

Development of a "HP 39gII+", an improved variant of the calculator powerful enough to include a CAS, was almost finished when the underlying processor was abandoned by Freescale, causing the project to be abandoned as well. Instead, the calculator concept was revised again and the specs further improved (e.g. color touchscreen, even more powerful processor), which eventually led to the release of the HP Prime in 2013.

== See also ==
- Comparison of HP graphing calculators
- HP calculators
- RPL character set
- newRPL (for HP 39g+, 39gs, 40gs)
