= College voor Toetsen en Examens =

Dutch quasi-autonomous non-governmental organisation

The College voor Toetsen en Examens (CvTE), previously known as College voor Examens before 1 August 2014, is a Dutch quasi-autonomous non-governmental organisation (quango) charged with administering the exams for Dutch secondary education institutions; those exams are standardised nationwide. The institution was founded by legislative act in 2009, and involved a merger of two state-controlled examination organisations. The organisation was severely criticized in 2013 following widespread displeasure concerning the exams for Dutch language and literature.
