= RPL character set =

Handheld calculator character set

The RPL character set is an 8-bit character set and encoding used by most RPL calculators manufactured by Hewlett-Packard as well as by the HP 82240B thermal printer. It is sometimes referred to simply as "ECMA-94" in documentation, although it is for the most part a superset of ISO/IEC 8859-1 / ECMA-94 in terms of printable characters, and it differs from ISO/IEC 8859-1 by using displayable characters rather than control characters in the 0x80 to 0x9F range of code points.

== Overview ==
In 1986, the original series of RPL calculators (HP-28 series) as well as the HP 82240A thermal printer used a modified variant of the HP Roman-8 character set, of which characters above 147 could not be displayed on the calculator, only be printed.

This changed with the introduction of the HP 82240B printer in 1989 and the HP 48 series in 1990, which came with a new character set now based on ECMA 94 / ISO 8859-1 instead of HP Roman-8, but with the control codes in the range 128 to 159 (0x80 to 0x9F) being replaced by additional displayable characters. Compared to ISO 8859-1, code point 127 (0x7F) showed a medium shaded gray box like in the former HP Roman-8 based character set. Code points 131 (0x83) to 142 (0x8E) were also taken over from the former HP Roman-8 based character set. In addition to this, code point 31 (0x1F) was used for ellipsis (…) and code points 169 (0xA9) and 174 (0xAE) showed ambiguous glyphs which could be viewed as inverse circled number ❸ or copyright symbol (©) and as ❷ or registered trademark symbol (®), respectively. This first version of the character set also had a non-breaking space at position 160 (0xA0).

Translation from HP-48 to HP-28 character set:

HP translation vector
	0	1	2	3	4	5	6	7	8	9	A	B	C	D	E	F
8x	0xA0	0x7F	0x7F	0x83	0x84	0x85	0x86	0x87	0x88	0x89	0x8A	0x8B	0x8C	0x8D	0x8E	0x76
9x	0x5E	0x7F	0x7F	0x7F	0x7F	0x7F	0x7F	0x7F	0x7F	0x7F	0x7F	0x7F	0x7F	0x7F	0xFC	0x7F
Ax	0x20	0xB8	0xBF	0xAF	0xBA	0xBC	0x7C	0xBD	0xAB	0x63	0xF9	0x92	0x7E	0x2D	0x52	0xB0
Bx	0xB3	0xFE	0x97	0x98	0xA8	0x8F	0xF4	0xF2	0x2C	0x31	0xFA	0x93	0xF7	0xF8	0xF5	0xB9
Cx	0xA1	0xE0	0xA2	0xE1	0xD8	0xD0	0xD3	0xB4	0xA3	0xDC	0xA4	0xA5	0xE6	0xE5	0xA6	0xA7
Dx	0xE3	0xB6	0xE8	0xE7	0xDF	0xE9	0xDA	0x82	0xD2	0xAD	0xED	0xAE	0xDB	0xB1	0xF0	0xDE
Ex	0xC8	0xC4	0xC0	0xE2	0xCC	0xD4	0xD7	0xB5	0xC9	0xC5	0xC1	0xCD	0xD9	0xD5	0xD1	0xDD
Fx	0xE4	0xB7	0xCA	0xC6	0xC2	0xEA	0xCE	0x81	0xD6	0xCB	0xC7	0xC3	0xCF	0xB2	0xF1	0xEF

In a revision of this character set in 1999, code point 160 (0xA0) was redefined to hold the euro sign (€) in the HP 49/50 series (including the HP 48gII), now deviating from ISO 8859-1. Code points 169 (0xA9) and 174 (0xAE) were now clearly defined as holding the copyright (©) and registered trademark (®) symbols in compliance with ISO 8859-1, whereas the corresponding glyphs still resembled the inverse circled numbers more. The last calculator supporting this variant of the character set was the HP 50g introduced in 2006 and discontinued in 2015.

In a parallel development, the HP 38G also used the HP 48 series' character set internally. Starting with the HP 39G in 2000, the superscript 3 (³) at code point 179 (0xB3) was replaced by a superscript -1 (^{−1}) in the HP 39/40 series (except for the HP 39gII, which started to use Unicode). Code point 160 (0xA0) was also changed to the euro sign (€) in this third variant of the character set. The last calculator supporting this variant of the character set was the HP 40gs introduced in 2006 and discontinued around 2011.

Hewlett-Packard never defined an official Unicode translation, hence several variants evolved in the community, differing in code points 31 (0x1F), 127 (0x7F), 128 (0x80), 129 (0x81), 133 (0x85), 134 (0x86), 158 (0x9E), 160 (0xA0), 169 (0xA9), 174 (0xAE), 178 (0xB3), 181 (0xB5) and 223 (0xDF).

The fact that the Unicode equivalent for x-bar at code point 129 (0x81) is a combination of two characters (x̅) could cause problems in translations, therefore it was suggested to use U+0101 (ā) instead.

Characters which cannot be reasonably transcoded should be mapped to code point 127 (0x7F), similar to what the calculators do when communicating with older printers like the HP 82240A.

Since the calculators allow fonts to be redefined (using FONT→, →FONT, MINIFONT→, →MINIFONT) other codepages can be emulated for as long as symbols which are available on the keyboard or are otherwise associated with specific functionality by the calculator aren't replaced by unrelated symbols.

== Code page layout ==
The following table shows the HP RPL character set. Each character is shown with a potential Unicode equivalent in the tooltip. Where special HP TIO codes are defined to enter the character, they are given as well. The other characters can be entered using the \nnn TIO code syntax with nnn being a three-digit decimal number.

HP RPL character set
	0	1	2	3	4	5	6	7	8	9	A	B	C	D	E	F
0x	NUL	SOH	STX	ETX	EOT	ENQ	ACK	BEL	BS	HT	↵/LF	VT	FF	CR	SO	SI
1x	DLE	DC1	DC2	DC3	DC4	NAK	SYN	ETB	CAN	EM	SUB	ESC	▯ (Note: Insert cursor)	◄ (Note: Overwrite cursor)	█ (Note: Left)	… (Note: Right)
2x	SP	!	"	#	$	%	&	'	(	)	*	+	,	-	.	/
3x	0	1	2	3	4	5	6	7	8	9	:	;	<	=	>	?
4x	@	A	B	C	D	E	F	G	H	I	J	K	L	M	N	O
5x	P	Q	R	S	T	U	V	W	X	Y	Z	[	\	]		_
6x	`	a	b	c	d	e	f	g	h	i	j	k	l	m	n	o
7x	p	q	r	s	t	u	v	w	x	y	z	{	|	}	~	▒
8x	∡/∠/∟	x̅/ā	∇	√	∫	Σ/∑	▶/►	π	∂	≤	≥	≠	α	→	←	↓
9x	↑	γ	δ	ε	η	θ	λ	ρ	σ	τ	ω	Δ	Π	Ω	■	∞
Ax	€/NBSP	¡	¢	£	¤	¥	¦	§	¨	©/❸	ª	«	¬	SHY	®/❷	¯
Bx	°	±	²	³/⁻¹	´	µ/μ	¶	·	¸	¹	º	»	¼	½	¾	¿
Cx	À	Á	Â	Ã	Ä	Å	Æ	Ç	È	É	Ê	Ë	Ì	Í	Î	Ï
Dx	Ð	Ñ	Ò	Ó	Ô	Õ	Ö	×	Ø	Ù	Ú	Û	Ü	Ý	Þ	ß/β
Ex	à	á	â	ã	ä	å	æ	ç	è	é	ê	ë	ì	í	î	ï
Fx	ð	ñ	ò	ó	ô	õ	ö	÷	ø	ù	ú	û	ü	ý	þ	ÿ

== See also ==
- HP trigraphs
- Western Latin character sets (computing)
- Hewlett-Packard calculator character sets
