= RPL (programming language) =

Handheld calculator operating system

- Paradigm: Concatenative (stack-based), structured
- Designed by: Hewlett-Packard
- First appeared: 1984 (1986)
- Stable release: unknown
- OS: HP calculators

Dialects
- System RPL, User RPL

Influenced by
- RPN, Forth, Lisp

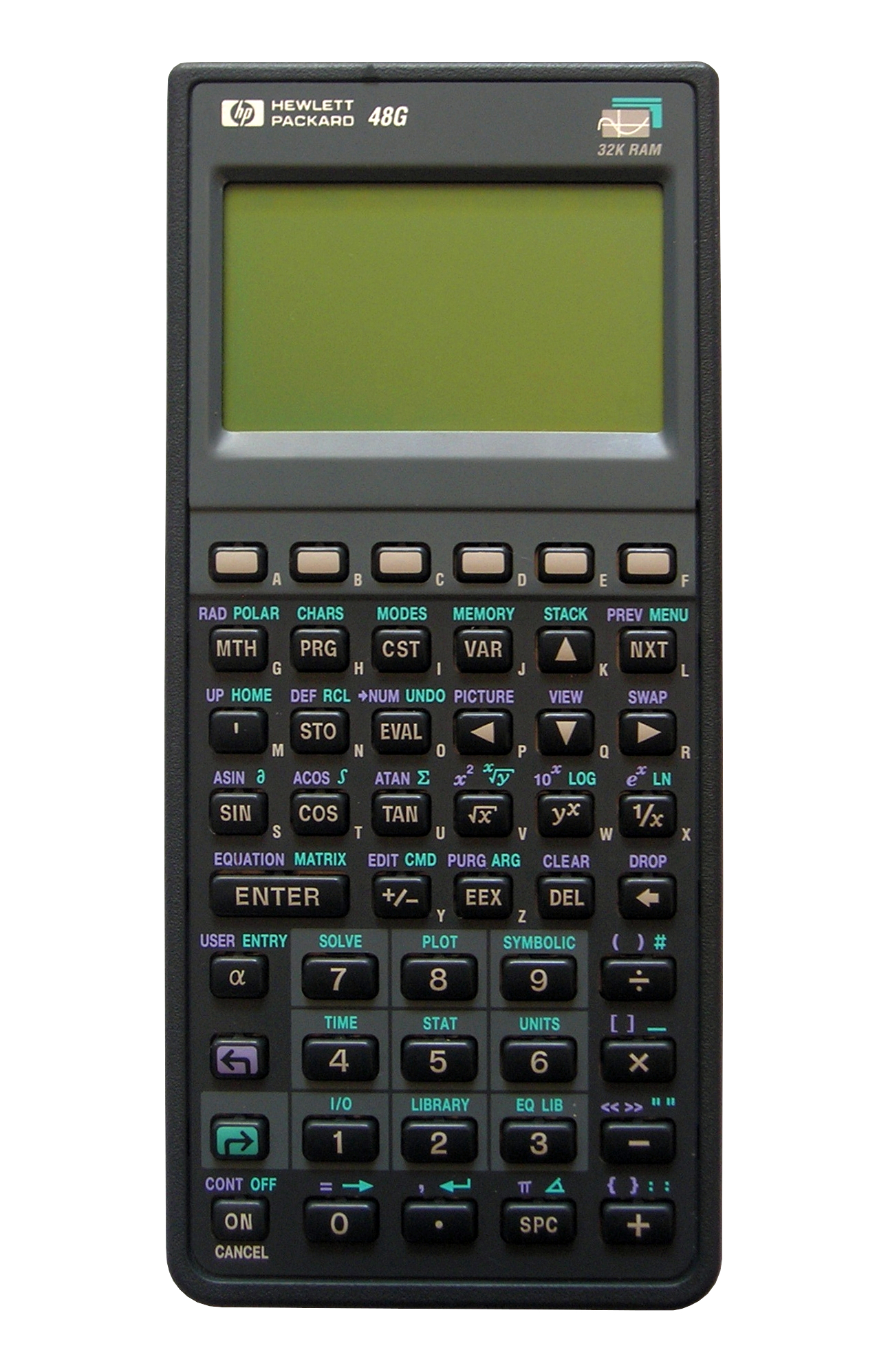
HP 48G calculator, uses RPL

RPL is a handheld calculator operating system and application programming language used on Hewlett-Packard's scientific graphing RPN (Reverse Polish Notation) calculators of the HP 28, 48, 49 and 50 series, but it is also usable on non-RPN calculators, such as the 38, 39 and 40 series. Internally, it was also utilized by the 17B, 18C, 19B and 27S.

RPL is a structured programming language based on RPN, but equally capable of processing algebraic expressions and formulae, implemented as a threaded interpreter. RPL has many similarities to Forth, both languages being stack-based, as well as the list-based LISP. Contrary to previous HP RPN calculators, which had a fixed four-level stack, the dynamic stack used by RPL is only limited by available RAM, with the calculator displaying an error message when running out of memory rather than silently dropping arguments off the stack as in fixed-sized RPN stacks.

RPL originated from HP's Corvallis, Oregon development facility in 1984 as a replacement for the previous practice of implementing the operating systems of calculators in assembly language. The first calculator utilizing it internally was the HP-18C and the first calculator making it available to users was the HP-28C, both from 1986. The last pocket calculator supporting RPL, the HP 50g, was discontinued in 2015. However, multiple emulators that can emulate HP's RPL calculators exist that run on a range of operating systems, and devices, including iOS and Android smartphones. There are also a number of community projects to recreate and extend RPL on newer calculators, like newRPL or DB48X, which may add features or improve performance.

== Variants ==
The internal low- to medium-level variant of RPL, called System RPL (or SysRPL) is used on some earlier HP calculators as well as the aforementioned ones, as part of their operating system implementation language. Most System RPL commands lack argument checking and are defined only for specific argument types (e.g. short integer vs. long integer), making System RPL programs run dramatically faster than equivalent User RPL ones. In addition, System RPL includes many advanced functions that are not available in User RPL. In the HP 48 series this variant of RPL is not accessible to the calculator user without the use of external tools, but in the HP 49/50 series there is a compiler built into ROM to use SysRPL. It is possible to cause a serious crash while writing SysRPL programs, so caution must be used while using it.

The high-level User RPL (or UserRPL) version of the language is available on said graphing calculators for developing textual as well as graphical application programs. All UserRPL programs are internally represented as SysRPL programs, but use only a safe subset of the available SysRPL commands. The error checking that is a part of UserRPL commands, however, makes UserRPL programs noticeably slower than equivalent SysRPL programs. The UserRPL command SYSEVAL tells the calculator to process designated parts of a UserRPL program as SysRPL code.

== Control blocks ==
RPL control blocks are not strictly postfix. Although there are some notable exceptions, the control block structures appear as they would in a standard infix language. The calculator manages this by allowing the implementation of these blocks to skip ahead in the program stream as necessary.

=== Conditional statements ===
==== IF/THEN/ELSE/END ====
RPL supports basic conditional testing through the IF/THEN/ELSE structure. The basic syntax of this block is:

 IF condition THEN if-true [ELSE if-false] END

The following example tests to see if the number at the bottom of the stack is "1" and, if so, replaces it with "Equal to one":

 « IF 1 == THEN "Equal to one" END »

The IF construct evaluates the condition then tests the bottom of the stack for the result. As a result, RPL can optionally support FORTH-style IF blocks, allowing the condition to be determined before the block. By leaving the condition empty, the IF statement will not make any changes to the stack during the condition execution and will use the existing result at the bottom of the stack for the test:

 « 1 == IF THEN "Equal to one" END »

==== IFT/IFTE ====
Postfix conditional testing may be accomplished by using the IFT ("if-then") and IFTE ("if-then-else") functions.

IFT and IFTE pop two or three commands off the stack, respectively. The topmost value is evaluated as a Boolean and, if true, the second topmost value is pushed back on the stack. IFTE allows a third "else" value that will be pushed back on the stack if the Boolean is false.

The following example uses the IFT function to pop an object from the bottom of the stack and, if it is equal to 1, replaces it with "One":

 « 1 == "One" IFT »

The following example uses the IFTE function to pop an object from the bottom of the stack and, if it is equal to 1, replaces it with "One". If it does not equal 1, it replaces it with the string "Not one":

 « 1 == "One" "Not one" IFTE »

IFT and IFTE will evaluate a program block given as one of its arguments, allowing a more compact form of conditional logic than an IF/THEN/ELSE/END structure. The following example pops an object from the bottom of the stack, and replaces it with "One", "Less", or "More", depending on whether it is equal to, less than, or greater than 1.

 «
   DUP 1 ==
   « DROP "One" »
   « 1 < "Less" "More" IFTE »
   IFTE
 »

==== CASE/THEN/END ====
To support more complex conditional logic, RPL provides the CASE/THEN/END structure for handling multiple exclusive tests. Only one of the branches within the CASE statement will be executed. The basic syntax of this block is:

 CASE 
  condition_1 THEN if-condition_1 END 
   ...
  condition_n THEN if-condition_n END
  if-none
 END

The following code illustrates the use of a CASE/THEN/END block. Given a letter at the bottom of the stack, it replaces it with its string equivalent or "Unknown letter":

 « 
   CASE 
      DUP "A" == THEN "Alpha" END
      DUP "B" == THEN "Beta" END
      DUP "G" == THEN "Gamma" END
      "Unknown letter"
   END
   SWAP DROP  @ Get rid of the original letter
 »

This code is identical to the following nested IF/THEN/ELSE/END block equivalent:

 «
    IF DUP "A" ==
    THEN
       "Alpha"
    ELSE 
       IF DUP "B" == THEN
          "Beta"
       ELSE 
          IF DUP "G" == THEN
             "Gamma"
          ELSE
             "Unknown letter"
          END
       END 
    END
    SWAP DROP  @ Get rid of the original letter
 »

=== Looping statements ===
==== FOR/NEXT ====
RPL provides a FOR/NEXT statement for looping from one index to another. The index for the loop is stored in a temporary local variable that can be accessed in the loop. The syntax of the FOR/NEXT block is:

index_from index_to FOR variable_name loop_statement NEXT

The following example uses the FOR loop to sum the numbers from 1 to 10. The index variable of the FOR loop is "I":

 « 
    0       @ Start with zero on the stack
    1 10    @ Loop from 1 to 10
    FOR I   @ "I" is the local variable
       I +  @ Add "I" to the running total
    NEXT    @ Repeat...
 »

==== START/NEXT ====
The START/NEXT block is used for a simple block that runs from a start index to an end index. Unlike the FOR/NEXT loop, the looping variable is not available. The syntax of the START/NEXT block is:

 index_from index_to START loop_statement NEXT

==== FOR/STEP and START/STEP ====
Both FOR/NEXT and START/NEXT support a user-defined step increment. By replacing the terminating NEXT keyword with an increment and the STEP keyword, the loop variable will be incremented or decremented by a different value than the default of +1. For instance, the following loop steps back from 10 to 2 by decrementing the loop index by 2:

 « 10 2 START -2 STEP »

==== WHILE/REPEAT/END ====
The WHILE/REPEAT/END block in RPL supports an indefinite loop with the condition test at the start of the loop. The syntax of the WHILE/REPEAT/END block is:

 WHILE condition REPEAT loop_statement END

==== DO/UNTIL/END ====
The DO/UNTIL/END block in RPL supports an indefinite loop with the condition test at the end of the loop. The syntax of the DO/UNTIL/END block is:

 DO loop_statement UNTIL condition END

== See also ==
- A Programming Language (APL)
- FOCAL keystroke programming
- High Performance Language (HPL)
- HP trigraphs
- Prime Programming Language (PPL)
- RPL character set

== Notes ==
1. "RPL" is derived from Reverse Polish Lisp according to its original developers, while for a short time in 1987 HP marketing attempted to coin the backronym ROM-based Procedural Language for it. In addition, the RPL initials are sometimes incorrectly interpreted as Reverse Polish Logic or Reverse Polish Language.
