= HP 38G =

Graphing calculator by Hewlett-Packard

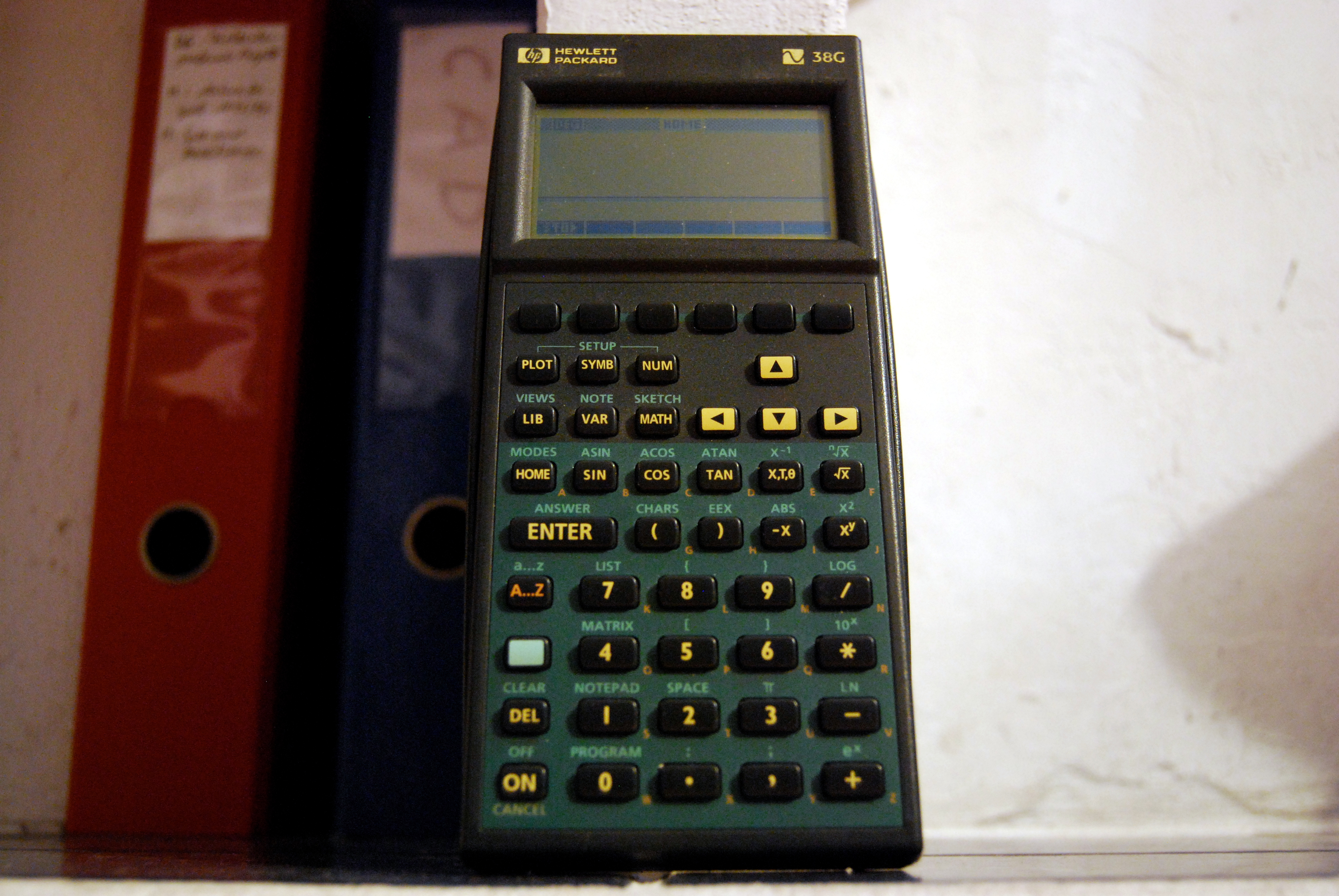
HP 38G

The HP 38G (F1200A, F1892A) is a programmable graphing calculator by Hewlett-Packard (HP). It was introduced in 1995 with a suggested retail price of US$80 (equivalent to $170 in 2025). HP credits a committee of eight high school, community college, and university teachers with assisting in the design of the calculator.

The calculator is derived from and the hardware is based on the more powerful science/engineering oriented HP 48 series of machines.

Unlike the HP 48 series, which offered both reverse Polish notation and algebraic entry logic, the HP 38G has only algebraic entry. The calculator is programmable, supporting small, interactive applications called "aplets".

== Successors ==
After a HP 38G+ prototype was cancelled in 1998, the 38G was replaced in 2000 by the HP 39G and (in Europe and some other markets) HP 40G. The two models were differentiated by the inclusion of a computer algebra system (CAS) in the HP 40G. An unofficial method of operating the 40G's CAS on the 39G was addressed in the next follow-up device, the HP 39g+ introduced in 2003, for which there is no known CAS implementation.

Further successors have included the HP 39gs and HP 40gs (with and without CAS) introduced in 2006, and the HP 39gII in 2011.

Beginning with the 39g+, all of these successors have been built using an ARM architecture CPU with varying degrees of emulation to support software written for previous members of the series, and have gradually added more modern methods of connectivity such as USB to either replace or supplement the original RS-232 and IR.

== See also ==
- Comparison of HP graphing calculators
- List of HP calculators
- RPL character set
