= HP CalcPad =

Series of calculators sold by Hewlett-Packard

The HP CalcPad series were calculators sold by Hewlett-Packard.

== HP CalcPad 100 ==
HP CalcPad 100
- Introduced: 2009

Interfaces
- Ports: USB port + 2 USB port hub

Other
- Power supply: USB
- Weight: 90 g
- Dimensions: 136 × 88 × 18 mm

The keypad layout of the HP CalcPad 100 (NW226AA) is similar to the standard PC 10-key numeric pad. The keypad includes basic mathematical functions: addition, subtraction, multiplication, and division. It is compatible with Microsoft Windows, Apple MacOS and other operating systems that support the USB protocol.

Has four hotkeys to access: Microsoft Excel, Word, clear desktop, HP CalcPad calculator.

The CalcPad 100 has two additional USB 2.0 ports and may be used as a hub for any USB-compatible PC peripherals.

== HP CalcPad 200 ==
HP CalcPad 200
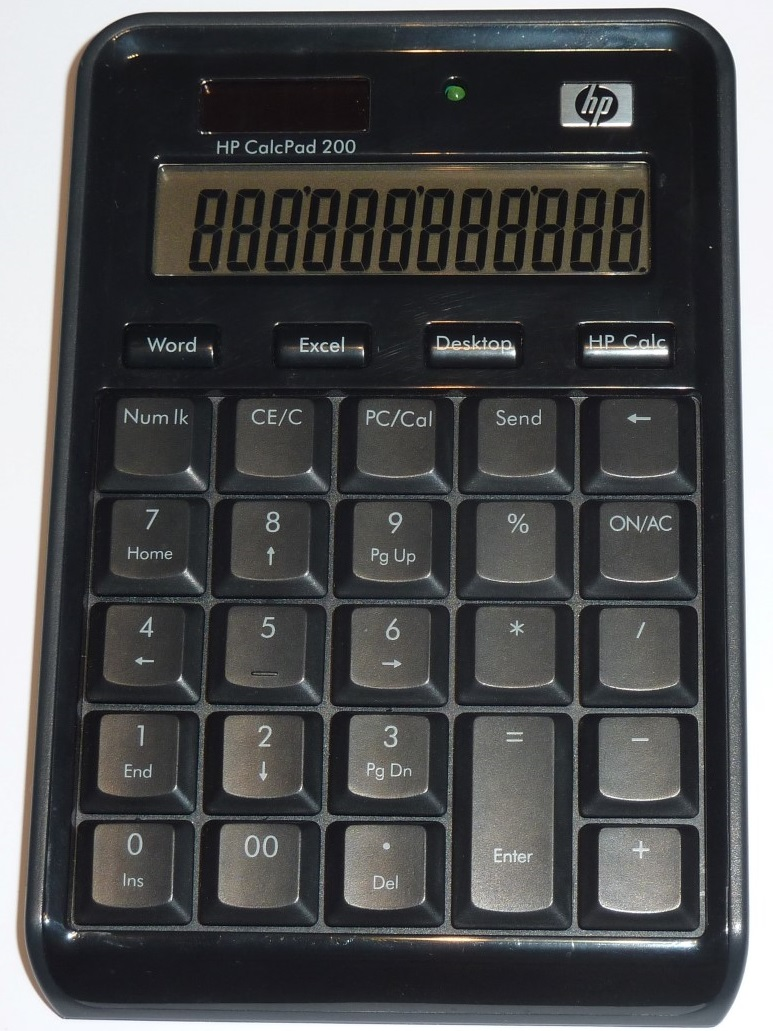
- HP CalcPad 200
- Introduced: 2009

Interfaces
- Ports: USB port + 2 USB port hub

Other
- Power supply: Solar (SC1230) with battery (AG13) back-up
- Weight: 130 g
- Dimensions: 155 × 103 × 18 mm

The keypad layout of the HP CalcPad 200 (NW227AA) is similar to the standard PC 10-key numeric pad. The keypad includes basic mathematical functions: addition, subtraction, multiplication, division, percent, constant and 00 key. It is compatible with Microsoft Windows, Apple MacOS and other operating systems that support the USB protocol.

Has four hotkeys to access: Microsoft Excel, Word, clear desktop, HP CalcPad calculator.

Unlike the CalcPad 100, the CalcPad 200 can work as a standalone basic business calculator, with a 12 digit LCD, powered by a solar cell with battery back-up and automatic shut off.

The CalcPad 200 has two additional USB 2.0 ports and may be used as a hub for any USB-compatible PC peripherals.

== See also ==
- List of HP calculators
