= Microblink =

Croatian software company

- Industry: Computer vision, Optical character recognition, Identity verification
- Founded: 2013; 13 years ago
- Founder: Damir Sabol
- Headquarters: Brooklyn, New York City
- Services: identity verification, document scanning, payment card recognition
- Website: microblink.com

Microblink is a Croatian software company specializing in computer vision, artificial intelligence (AI), optical character recognition (OCR), and identity verification technologies.

The company develops software development kits (SDKs) and identity verification products used for document scanning, biometric verification, and data extraction from identity documents, payment cards, receipts, and other printed materials.

== History ==
Microblink was founded in 2012 as PhotoPay by Damir Sabol, the founder of Iskon Internet, as a mobile computer vision company developing optical character recognition (OCR) and real-time document scanning technologies. The company launched PhotoPay, a mobile banking application that scans PDF417 barcodes and utility bills to enable instant payments.

In October 2014, the company launched Photomath, a smartphone application capable of recognizing printed mathematical equations through a device's camera and displaying step-by-step solutions using smartphone-based OCR and computer vision technology.

In 2017, the company introduced SIM Card Registration, a mobile solution combining BlinkID with SIM card scanning to automate prepaid SIM registration for telecommunications providers.

In 2020, the company raised $60 million in a Series B investment led by Silversmith Capital Partners to expand its identity verification business internationally. In 2022, the company acquired Sourcepad, a software development and engineering company. In May 2022, Google announced an agreement with Microblink to acquire Photomath. The acquisition was approved unconditionally by the European Commission in March 2023.

As of 2022, the company's Identity division included BlinkID, BlinkID Verify and BlinkPass, while its Commerce division included BlinkCard and BlinkReceipt, and as of 2026, Microblink's products included enterprise identity verification, biometric authentication, fraud detection, and document recognition technologies.

== Recognition ==
In 2025, Microblink received recognition in the U.S. Department of Homeland Security Science and Technology Directorate's Remote Identity Validation Rally (RIVR) Awards for its document validation technology alongside other companies in the identity verification industry.
