= Photomath =

Camera calculator

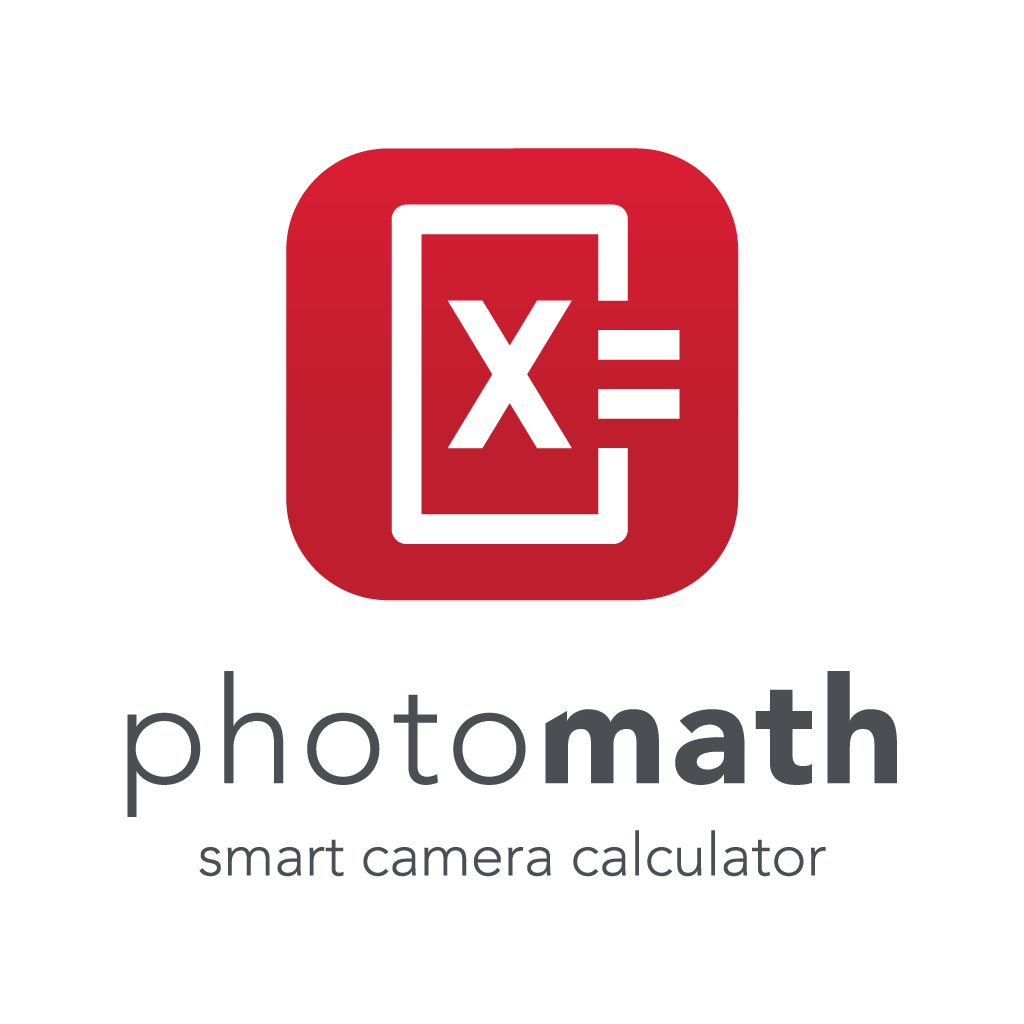
- Developer: Google
- Release: 2014

Stable release(s) [±]
- Android: 8.47.1 / 20 March 2026; 7 months ago
- iOS: 8.46.0 / 12 February 2026; 8 months ago
- Written in: Java (Android/Windows)
- Operating system: Android, iOS
- Available in: 32 languages
- Type: Education Technology
- License: Freeware, proprietary
- Website: photomath.com

Photomath is an educational technology mobile app, owned by Google. It features a computer algebra system with an augmented optical character recognition system, designed for use with a smartphone's camera to scan and recognize mathematical equations; the app then displays step-by-step explanations onscreen.

The app is based on a text recognition engine developed by Microblink, a company based in London and Croatia and led by founder Damir Sabol, which also includes the developers of both Photomath and Photopay. Photomath LLC was legally registered in San Mateo, California. In 2021, Photomath announced $23 million in Series B funding led by Menlo Ventures, with contributions from GSV Ventures, Learn Capital, Cherubic Ventures, and Goodwater Capital.

In May 2022, Google announced it would acquire the company for an undisclosed amount. After review by the European Commission, the deal received approval in March 2023 and concluded in June. This takeover represented the largest startup acquisition in Croatian history, with Photomath being the nation's leading app at that time. This acquisition was cited as a strategic move by Google in response to ChatGPT. Upon Photomath's dissolution, Sabol transitioned to the role of Director of Software Engineering at Google. As of February 29, 2024, Google has integrated the app into its Play Store publisher portfolio.

== Description ==
Photomath utilizes the camera of a user's smartphone or tablet to scan and identify mathematical problems. Upon recognition, the app displays the steps to solve the problem. The app presents these steps through various methods and approaches, elucidating the problem-solving process in a step-by-step manner to educate users.

Starting in 2016, the app expanded its capabilities to include handwriting recognition, alongside printed text, allowing students to scan both textbooks and handwritten mathematical notes.

In 2017, Photomath was recognized by The Tech Edvocate as one of the top 20 teaching and learning applications.

While Photomath is predominantly free, it also provides a subscription-based service, ‘Photomath Plus’, which enhances functionality with features like solving mathematical word problems and providing solutions to textbook exercises.

As of 2021, Photomath boasts over 220 million downloads globally, with its official website reporting the resolution of 2.2 billion problems monthly and adoption by over 1 million educators.
