= Calculated Industries =

American calculator company

Calculated Industries, sometimes referred to as CI, is a company that specializes in industry specific calculators. Calculated Industries was incorporated in California in early 1978. The ownership changed that same year, when two brothers, Fred and Ken Alexander, took control. In 1994, the company relocated from Southern California to Carson City, Nevada.

== History ==
Calculated Industries' first entry into the calculator business came in the later 1970s with The Loan Arranger. It was one of the first Real Estate calculators to simplify the process of calculating a loan payment, breaking away from the traditional financial key labeling of “I”, “PV”, “FV” to more clearly labeled function keys. It also predated the well-known HP12c financial calculator.

With the success of The Loan Arranger the Alexander brothers tried a few other specialty calculators such as the GradeMatic calculator which helped teachers compute student grades, and the Graphic Arts Master. However, the real success of the company came in 1985 with the creation of the Construction Master. According to Mark Bollman, a mathematics and calculator historian and associate professor of mathematics at Albion College, the "Construction Master is the first in a long and profitable line of CI construction calculators". The Construction Master came preprogrammed with common construction calculations, and was a significant move forward for those dealing with construction math (such as angles, stairs, roofing math, pitch, rise, run, etc.). Fine Homebuilding magazine described the calculator as a noteworthy contribution to those in the construction field in an article based on the 25 Years of Milestones that help shape the homebuilding industry. The success of the Construction Master calculator gave the company drive to focus on more construction-related products and has since produced related calculators such as the ElectriCalc, Material Estimator, Heavy Calc, Project Calc, and most recently a Pipe Trades calculator.

== Development ==
While their core business is now mainly focused on the construction industry, CI has developed other specialty products such as a kitchen calculator, a Quilters' calculator (the FabriCalc), and the Time Master, as well as developing a series of cost-effective digital devices to measure blueprint takeoffs.

As of 2010, the company is still developing specialty calculators and won runner-up at the SEMA show for best new product of 2010 for a new Hot Rod Calc which assists with engine modification math.

Calculated Industries has made product under the Sears Craftsman name, Cooper tools, and for the International Training Institute (ITI) in conjunction with the Sheet Metal Workers International Association. Several models are used in the United Association and United Brotherhood of Carpenters (UBC) apprenticeship training programs.

== Earlier models ==
Early CI calculator models included:

- The Loan Arranger (1978)
- Financial I (1982)
- GradeMatic: version: 100 (1983)
- Construction Master (1985)
- Pocket Handyman (1985)
- Dimension Calculator (1985)
- Time Master v1.0 (1989)
- Wall Street Wizard (1989)
- Construction Master III Trig Plus (1992)
- Pocket Appraiser (1993)

== Current CI calculators ==
Construction related products:

- Construction Master
- Pipe Trades Pro
- PlumbingCalc Pro
- Material Estimator
- ElectricCalc Pro
- ConcreteCalc Pro
- HeavyCalc Pro
- Measure Master Pro

Real estate/mortgage products:

- Qualifier Plus
- Mortgage Qualifier Plus
- Mortgage PaymentCalc
- Real Estate Master

Hobby and other calculators:

- Home ProjectCalc
- Quilter's FabricCalc
- NautiCalc
- KitchenCalc
- ScheduleCalc
- Time Master
- Hot Rod Calc (now under the Mr. G brand)

Measuring / takeoff devices:

- Prexiso X2 Laser Distance Measurer
- DigiRoller Plus
- Scale Master
- Ultra Scale Master Pro
