= Monroe Epic =

The Monroe EPIC was a programmable calculator that came on the market in the 1964. It consisted of a large desktop unit which attached to a floor-standing logic tower and was capable of being programmed to perform many computer-like functions. However, the only form of a branching instruction available was a hard-coded unconditional branch (GOTO) that always executed at program completion (the end of the operation stack) to return to the starting instruction of the program (looped back to the beginning of operation stack). This made the creation of conditional branching logic, such as IF-THEN-ELSE, impossible.
