= List of products using ARM processors =

List of ARM cores

This is a list of products using processors (i.e. central processing units) based on the ARM architecture family, sorted by generation release and name.

== List of products ==
| Processor | SOCs | Other products |
|---|---|---|
| ARM1 | ARM1 | ARM Evaluation System second processor for BBC Micro |
| ARM2 | ARM2 | Acorn Archimedes, ChessMachine |
| ARM250 | ARM250 | Acorn Archimedes |
| ARM3 | ARM3 | Acorn Archimedes |
| ARM60 | ARM60 | 3DO Interactive Multiplayer, Zarlink GPS receiver |
| ARM610 | ARM610 | Acorn Risc PC 600, Apple Newton 100 series |
| ARM700 | ARM700 | Acorn Risc PC prototype CPU card |
| ARM710 | ARM710 | Acorn Risc PC 700 |
| ARM710a | ARM7100, ARM 7500 and ARM7500FE | Acorn Risc PC 700, Apple eMate 300, Psion Series 5 (ARM7100), Acorn A7000 (ARM7500), Acorn A7000+ (ARM7500FE), Network Computer (ARM7500FE) |
| ARM7TDMI(-S) | Atmel AT91SAM7, NXP Semiconductors LPC2xxx and LH7, Actel CoreMP7 | Game Boy Advance, Nintendo DS, Nintendo DSi, Apple iPod, Lego NXT, Juice Box, Garmin Navigation Devices (1990s – early 2000s) |
| ARM710T | | Psion Series 5mx, Psion Revo/Revo Plus/Diamond Mako |
| ARM720T | NXP Semiconductors LH7952x | Zipit Wireless Messenger |
| StrongARM | Digital SA-110, SA-1100, SA-1110 | SA-110 Apple Newton 2x00 series, Acorn Risc PC, Rebel/Corel Netwinder, Chalice CATS SA-1100 Psion netBook, Empeg Car SA-1110 LART (computer), Intel Assabet, Ipaq H36x0, Balloon2, Zaurus SL-5x00, HP Jornada 7xx, Jornada 560 series |
| ARM810 | | Acorn Risc PC prototype CPU card |
| ARM920T | Atmel AT91RM9200, AT91SAM9, Cirrus Logic EP9302, EP9307, EP9312, EP9315, Samsung S3C2442, S3C2410, S3C2440 | A9home, Armadillo, GP32, GP2X (first core), Tapwave Zodiac (Motorola i.MX1), Hewlett-Packard HP-49/50 Calculators, Sun SPOT, HTC TyTN, FIC Neo FreeRunner, Garmin Navigation Devices (mid–late 2000s), TomTom navigation devices; Boardcon EM2440-III |
| ARM922T | NXP Semiconductors LH7A40x | |
| ARM940T | | GP2X (second core), Meizu M6 Mini Player |
| ARM926EJ-S | Texas Instruments OMAP1710, OMAP1610, OMAP1611, OMAP1612, OMAP-L137, OMAP-L138; Qualcomm MSM6xxx; Freescale i.MX21, i.MX27, i.MX28, Atmel AT91SAM9, NXP Semiconductors LPC3xxx, Samsung S3C2412, NEC C10046F5-211-PN2-A SoC – undocumented core in the ATi Hollywood graphics chip used in the Wii, Telechips TCC7801, TCC7901, ZiiLABS ZMS-05, Rockchip RK2806 and RK2808, NeoMagic MiMagic Family MM6, MM6+, MM8, MTV., CSR Quatro 4300 series | Mobile phones: Sony Ericsson (K, W series); Siemens and Benq (x65 series and newer); LG Arena; GPH Wiz; Squeezebox Duet Controller (Samsung S3C2412). Squeezebox Radio; Buffalo TeraStation Live (NAS); Drobo FS (NAS); Western Digital MyBook I World Edition; Western Digital MyBook II World Edition; Seagate FreeAgent DockStar STDSD10G-RK; Seagate FreeAgent GoFlex Home; Chumby Classic; Nintendo Wii Hollywood: Starlet; Nintendo Wii U Latte Starlet; Wii U GamePad; Lego Mindstorms EV3 |
| ARM946E-S | | Nintendo DS, Nintendo DSi, Nintendo 3DS, Nokia N-Gage, Canon PowerShot A470, Canon EOS 5D Mark II, Conexant 802.11 chips, Samsung S5L2010 |
| ARM966E-S | STMicroelectronics STR91xF | |
| ARM968E-S | NXP Semiconductors LPC29xx | |
| ARM1020E | Samsung SPGPv3 Asic for laser printers | |
| ARM1026EJ-S | Conexant CX94610 and CX94615 ADSL SoC | |
| XScale | Intel 80200, 80219, PXA210, PXA250, PXA255, PXA263, PXA26x, PXA27x, PXA3xx, PXA900, IXC1100, IXP42x | 80219 Thecus N2100 IOP321 Iyonix PXA210/PXA250 Zaurus SL-5600, C700, iPAQ H3900, Sony CLIÉ NX60, NX70V, NZ90 PXA255 Gumstix basix & connex, Palm Tungsten E2, Zaurus SL-C750, 760, 860, Mentor Ranger & Stryder, iRex ILiad PXA263 Sony CLIÉ NX73V, NX80V PXA26x Palm Tungsten T3 PXA27x Gumstix verdex, "Trizeps-Modules", "eSOM270-Module" PXA270 COM, HTC Universal, HP hx4700, Zaurus SL-C1000, 3000, 3100, 3200, Dell Axim x30, x50, and x51 series, Motorola Q, Balloon3, Trolltech Greenphone, Palm TX, Motorola Ezx Platform A728, A780, A910, A1200, E680, E680i, E680g, E690, E895, Rokr E2, Rokr E6, Fujitsu Siemens LOOX N560, Toshiba Portégé G500, Palm Trēo 650-755p, Palm Centro, Zipit Z2, HP iPaq 614c Business Navigator, I-mate PDA2 PXA3XX Samsung Omnia, Samsung SGH-i780 PXA900 Blackberry 8700, Blackberry Pearl (8100) IXP42x NSLU2 |
| ARM1136J(F)-S | Texas Instruments OMAP2420, Qualcomm MSM7200, MSM7201A, MSM7225, MSM7227, Freescale i.MX31 and MXC300-30, CSR Quatro 4230 | OMAP2420 Nokia E90, Nokia N93, Nokia N95, Nokia N82, Zune, BUGbase, Nokia N800, Nokia N810 MSM7200 Eten Glofiish, HTC TyTN II, HTC Nike Freescale i.MX31 original Zune 30 GB, Toshiba Gigabeat S and Kindle DX Freescale MXC300-30 Nokia E63, Nokia E71, Nokia 5800, Nokia E51, Nokia 6700 Classic, Nokia 6120 Classic, Nokia 6210 Navigator, Nokia 6220 Classic, Nokia 6290, Nokia 6710 Navigator, Nokia 6720 Classic, Nokia E75, Nokia N97, Nokia N81 Qualcomm MSM7201A HTC Dream (T-Mobile G1), HTC Magic, Motorola i1, Motorola Z6, HTC Hero, Samsung SGH-i627 (Propel Pro), Sony Ericsson Xperia X10 Mini Pro Qualcomm MSM7225 HTC Wildfire Qualcomm MSM7227 Samsung Galaxy Ace, Samsung Galaxy Mini, ZTE Link, HTC Wildfire S, HTC Legend, HTC Aria, Viewsonic ViewPad 7 |
| ARM1176JZ(F)-S | Broadcom BCM2835, Conexant CX2427X, Nvidia GoForce 6100; Telechips TCC9101, TCC9201, TCC8900, Fujitsu MB86H60, Samsung S3C6410, S3C6430, Qualcomm MSM7627, Infineon X-GOLD 213 | Apple iPhone (original and 3G), Apple iPod touch (1st and 2nd Generation), Motorola RIZR Z8, Motorola RIZR Z10 Broadcom BCM2835 Raspberry Pi, Roku 2 S3C6410 Samsung Omnia II, Samsung Moment, Samsung M910 Intercept, SmartQ 5, Samsung I5700, Boardcon SBC6410, Boardcon Idea6410 Qualcomm MSM7627 Palm Pixi, LG Optimus V (VM670) and Motorola Calgary/Devour Telechips TCC8900 StorageSolutions Scroll 7" (Resistive/Capacitive), StorageSolutions miScroll 7", StorageSolutions Scroll 8" |
| ARM11 MPCore | Nvidia APX 2500 (Tegra), CSR Quatro 4500 series, Quatro 5300 series | Nintendo 3DS |
| Cortex-A5 | Telechips TCC892x, Qualcomm Snapdragon MSM7225A/MSM7625A/MSM7227A/MSM7627A, Atmel SAMA5 (D2/D3/D4) | |
| Cortex-A7 | Freescale i.MX6 UltraLite, Allwinner A20/A83T/A33/A40i/A50, Broadcom BCM2836, Rockchip RK3128 | Freescale i.MX6 UltraLite Boardcon EM6ul SBC, EINK-IMX7 SBC, MYS-6ULX Single Board Computer Allwinner A40i Boardcon EMA40i Broadcom BCM2836 Raspberry Pi 2 Rockchip RK3128 Boardcon Compact3128 |
| Cortex-A8 | Allwinner A10, Allwinner A13, Texas Instruments OMAP3xxx series, Freescale i.MX51-SOC, Freescale i.MX53 QSB, Apple A4, ZiiLABS ZMS-08, Snapdragon, Samsung Hummingbird S5PC100/S5PC110, Marvell ARMADA 500/600, Qualcomm Snapdragon QSD8672/MSM8260/MSM8660(based on Cortex A8), Rockchip RK2918 | HTC Desire, SBM7000, Oregon State University OSWALD, Gumstix Overo Earth, Pandora, Apple iPhone 3GS, Apple iPod touch (3rd and 4th Generation), Apple iPad (A4), Apple iPhone 4 (A4), Apple TV (Second Generation) (A4), Archos 5, Archos 43, BeagleBoard, Genesi EFIKA MX, Motorola Droid, Motorola Droid X, Motorola Droid 2, Motorola Droid R2D2 Edition, Palm Pre, Palm Pre 2, HP Veer, HP Pre 3, Samsung Omnia HD, Samsung Wave S8500, Samsung i9000 Galaxy S, Samsung P1000 Galaxy Tab, Sony Ericsson Satio, Sony Ericsson Xperia X10, Touch Book, Nokia N900, Meizu M9, Google Nexus S, Galaxy SL, Sharp PC-Z1 "Netwalker", MYD-C437X Development Board. |
| Cortex-A9 | Texas Instruments OMAP4, ST-Ericsson NovaThor U8500 / U9500, Nvidia Tegra2, Tegra3, Samsung Orion / Exynos 4210, STMicroelectronics SPEAr1310, Xilinx Extensible Processing Platform, Trident PNX847x/8x/9x STB SoC, Freescale i.MX6, Apple A5 | Samsung Galaxy S II (Samsung Exynos), Sony Xperia U, Samsung Galaxy S III, Apple iPad 2 and iPhone 4S (A5), BlackBerry PlayBook (TI OMAP4430), LG Optimus 2X, LG Optimus 3D, Motorola Atrix 4G, Motorola DROID BIONIC, Motorola Xoom, PandaBoard, PlayStation Vita, HP TouchPad, Acer ICONIA TAB A-series, HTC Sensation, HTC EVO 3D, ASUS Eee Pad Transformer, ASUS Eee Pad Transformer Prime, Lenovo IdeaPad K2, Z-turn Board single board computer |
| Cortex-A12 | | |
| Cortex-A15 | Texas Instruments OMAP5, Samsung Exynos 5250, ST Ericsson NovaThor A9600, Fujitsu, Nvidia Tegra 4 | Samsung/Google Nexus 10, Samsung Chromebook XE303 |
| Cortex-A17 | Rockchip: RK3288 | RK3288 Asus Tinker Board, Boardcon EM3288 SBC |
| Cortex-A32 | | |
| Cortex-A35 | NXP i.MX8X, MediaTek MT6799, MT8516, Rockchip RK3308 | |
| Cortex-A53 | Actions GT7, S900, V700, Allwinner A64, H5, H64, R18, Altera Stratix 10, Amlogic S9 Family, T96x, Broadcom BCM2837, EZchip TILE-Mx100, HiSilicon Kirin 620, 650, 655, 658, 659, 930, 935, Marvell Armada PXA1928, Mobile PXA1908/PXA1936, MediaTek MT673x, MT675x, MT6761, MT6762, MT6763, MT6765, MT6795, MT8161, MT8163, MT8165, MT8732, MT8735, MT8752, NXP ARM S32, QorIQ LS1088, LS1043, i.MX8M, Qualcomm Snapdragon 215, 410, 412, 415, 425, 427, 430, 435, 429, 439, 450, 610, 615, 616, 617, 625, 626, 630, Renesas RZ/V2M, Rockchip RK3328, RK3368, Samsung Exynos 7570, 7578, 7580, 7870, 7880, Spreadtrum SC9860/GV, SC9836, Texas Instruments Sitara AM6xxx, Xilinx ZynqMP 1892BA018 «SCYTHIAN» (Russian: 1892ВА018 СКИФ) (Note: Product of Moscow-based Russian designing company SPP "Elvis" (Russian: НПЦ "Элвис")) | Broadcom BCM2837: Raspberry Pi 3, HiSilicon Kirin Series: See List of HiSilicon Kirin SoC, Mediatek MT Series : See List of Mediatek MT SoC, Qualcomm Snapdragon Series: See List of Qualcomm Snapdragon SoC |
| Cortex-A55 | Samsung: Exynos 850, UNISOC: SC9863, SC9863A, Rockchip: RK3566, RK3568 | Rockchip RK3566: Boardcon Compact3566 |
| Cortex-A57 | AMD: Opteron A1100-series, NXP: QorIQ LS20xx, Nvidia: Tegra X1 and Tegra X2, Qualcomm: Snapdragon 808 & 810, Samsung: Exynos 7 5433, 7420, HiSilicon: Kirin Hi1610 and Hi1612 | Tegra X1 Nintendo Switch |
| Cortex-A72 | HiSilicon Kirin 950, 955, Kunpeng 916, MediaTek MT6797, MT8173, MT8176, MT8693, MStar 6A938, Qualcomm Snapdragon 650, 652, 653, Rockchip RK3399, NXP QorIQ LS2088, QorIQ LS1046A, QorIQ LX2160A, QorIQ LS1028A, i.MX8 | Rockchip RK3399: Boardcon EM3399 SBC; Broadcom BCM2711: Raspberry Pi 4 |
| Cortex-A73 | Qualcomm Snapdragon 460, 636, 660, 632, 662, 665, 680, 835, Samsung Exynos 7872, 7884, 7885, 7904, 9609, 9610, 9611, HiSilicon Kirin 710, 960, 970, MediaTek MT6771, MT6799, MT8183, Amlogic S922X | |
| Cortex-A75 | Qualcomm Snapdragon 670, 710, 712, 845, 850, Samsung Exynos 9820, 9825, MediaTek MT6768, MT6769, MT6779, Unisoc T310, T606, T610, T616, T618, T700, T710, T740 | |
| Cortex-A76 | Google Tensor, HiSilicon Kirin 810, 820, 980, 985, 990, Qualcomm Snapdragon 480(+), 675, 678, 720G, 730(G), 732G, 765(G), 768G, 855(+) and 860, 7c, 7c Gen 2, 8c, 8cx and 8cx Gen 2, Microsoft SQ1 and SQ2, MediaTek MT6781, MT6785, Dimensity 700, 720, 800(U), 810, 820, 6020, Kompanio 820, Samsung Exynos 990, Unisoc T760, T770, Rockchip RK3588 | Rockchip RK3588: Boardcon CM3588 SoM Broadcom BCM2712: Raspberry Pi 5 |
| Cortex-A77 | MediaTek Dimensity 1000, Qualcomm Snapdragon 690, 750G, 865(+) and 870, HiSilicon Kirin 9000, Samsung Exynos 880, 980 | |
| Cortex-A78 | Google Tensor G2, MediaTek Dimensity 900, 920, 930, 1050, 1080, 1100, 1200, 1300, 8000, 8100, 8200, Kompanio 900T, 1200, 1380, 1300T, Qualcomm Snapdragon 4 Gen 1, 695, 6 Gen 1, 778G(+), 780G, 782G, 888(+), Samsung Exynos 1080, 1280, 1330, 1380, 2100; Nvidia Tegra Orin | Tegra T239 Nintendo Switch 2 |
| Cortex-A710 | MediaTek Dimensity 9000, Qualcomm Snapdragon 7 Gen 1, 7+ Gen 2, 8(+) Gen 1, 8 Gen 2 Samsung Exynos 2200 | |
| Cortex-A715 | MediaTek Dimensity 7200, 9200, Qualcomm Snapdragon 8 Gen 2 | |
| Cortex-X1 | Google Tensor, Tensor G2, Qualcomm Snapdragon 888(+), Samsung Exynos 2100 | |
| Cortex-X2 | MediaTek Dimensity 9000, Qualcomm Snapdragon 7+ Gen 2, 8(+) Gen 1, Samsung Exynos 2200 | |
| Cortex-X3 | MediaTek Dimensity 9200, Qualcomm Snapdragon 8 Gen 2 | |
| Cortex-X4 | MediaTek Dimensity 9300, Qualcomm Snapdragon 8 Gen 3 | |
| Cortex-R4(F) | Broadcom, Texas Instruments RM4, TMS570 | |
| Cortex-R5F | Scaleo OLEA, Texas Instruments RM57, Xilinx ZynqMP, Renesas RZ/T2M | |
| Cortex-M0 | STM32 F0, NXP Semiconductors LPC11xx, LPC12xx, Triad Semiconductor, Melfas, Chungbuk Technopark, Nuvoton, austriamicrosystems, Rohm, Infineon Embedded Power TLE984x | |
| Cortex-M0+ | NXP Semiconductors LPC8xx Freescale Kinetis L | |
| Cortex-M1 | Actel ProASIC3, ProASIC3L, IGLOO and Fusion PSC devices, Altera Cyclone III, other FPGA products are also supported e.g. Synplicity | |
| Cortex-M3 | Texas Instruments Stellaris, STMicroelectronics STM32 F1 , NXP Semiconductors LPC13xx, LPC17xx, LPC18xx, Toshiba TMPM330, Ember EM3xx, Atmel AT91SAM3, Europe Technologies EasyBCU, Energy Micro EFM32, Actel SmartFusion, mbed microcontroller, Cypress PSoC5, Infineon Embedded Power TLE986x, TLE987x | Arduino Due, Pebble |
| Cortex-M4(F) | Freescale Kinetis (M4), NXP Semiconductors LPC4xxx (M4F), STMicroelectronics STM32 F4 / F3 (M4F), Texas Instruments (M4F) Tiva series | Teensy 3.0 |
| Processor | SOCs | Other products |

== See also ==
- ARM architecture family
- Semiconductor intellectual property core (IP cores)
- List of ARM processors
- Field-programmable gate array cores – processors for FPGA
