= Propel =

Propel or propelling may refer to:

- Propulsion, to push forward or drive an object forward
- Samsung A767 Propel, a mobile phone
  - Samsung i627 Propel Pro
- Propel Water, a drink from the makers of Gatorade
- Propel, a steroid eluting sinus stent
- Propel (company), a software company
- Propel (political party), a political party in Wales

== See also ==
- Propeller (disambiguation)
