= Apple A4 =

System-on-a-chip designed by Apple Inc.

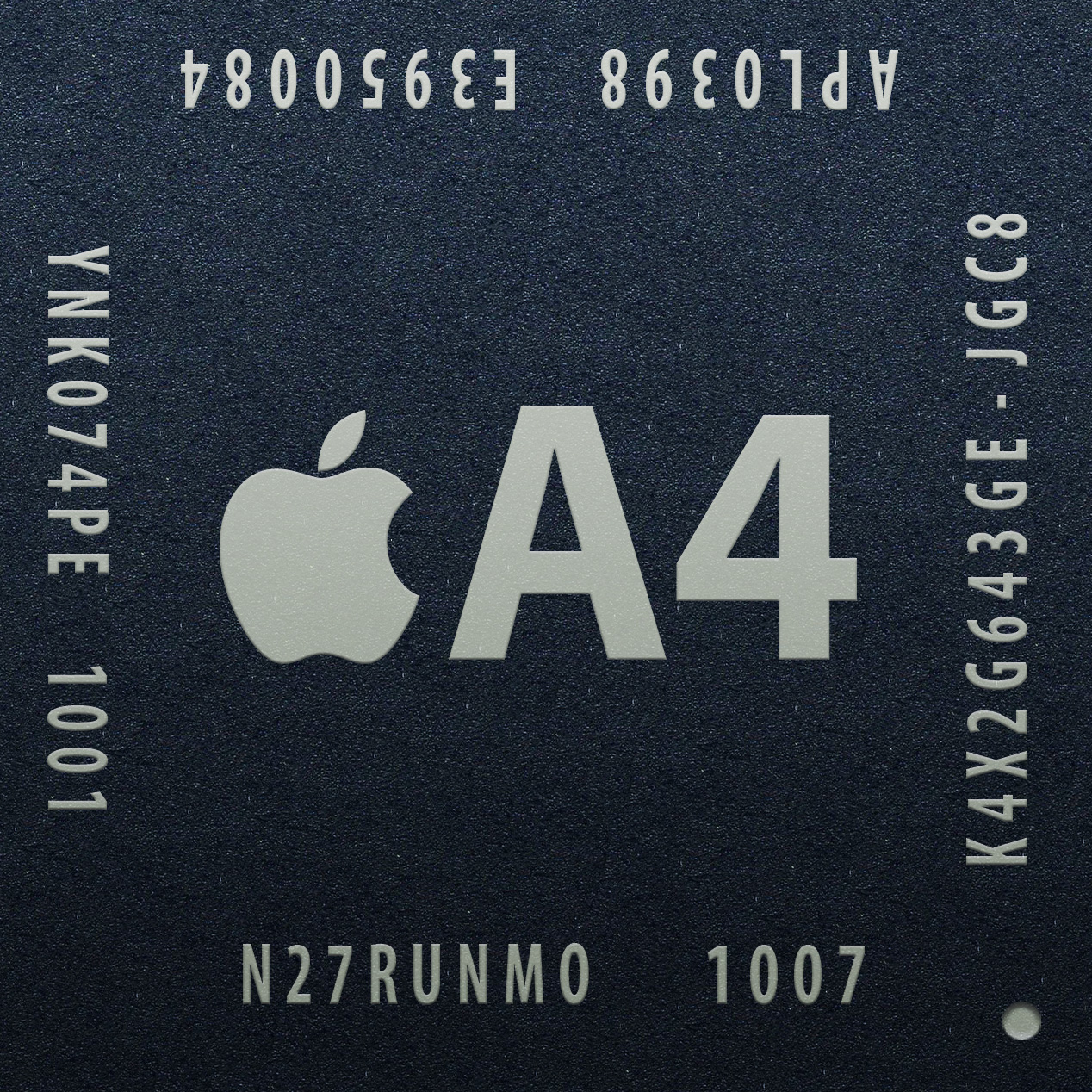

General information
- Launched: April 3, 2010
- Discontinued: September 10, 2013
- Designed by: Apple Inc.
- Common manufacturer: Samsung Electronics
- Product code: S5L8930X

Performance
- Max. CPU clock rate: 800 MHz to 1 GHz

Physical specifications
- Cores: 1
- GPU: PowerVR SGX535

Cache
- L1 cache: 32 KB instruction + 32 KB data
- L2 cache: 512 KB

Architecture and classification
- Application: Mobile
- Technology node: 45 nm
- Microarchitecture: ARM Cortex-A8
- Instruction set: ARMv7-A

History
- Predecessor: Samsung S5L8920
- Successors: Apple A5 (iPhone); Apple A5X (iPad)

The Apple A4 is a 32-bit package on package (PoP) system on a chip (SoC) designed by Apple Inc., part of the Apple silicon series, and manufactured by Samsung. The A4 was the first SoC Apple designed in-house, as the processors for the first 3 iPhone models were designed by Samsung instead. The first product to feature the A4 was the first-generation iPad, followed by the iPhone 4, fourth-generation iPod Touch, and second-generation Apple TV.

The last operating system update Apple provided for a mobile device containing an A4 (that being the iPhone 4) was iOS 7.1.2, which was released on June 30, 2014 as it was discontinued with the release of iOS 8 in September 2014. The iPad (1st generation) and fourth generation iPod Touch were discontinued earlier than the iPhone 4, with the former last receiving iOS 5.1.1 on May 7, 2012, mainly due to some of iOS 6 new features required a rear & front camera (as the iPhone 3GS, which had a rear camera and weaker hardware, received iOS 6 update with limited new features), while the latter last receiving iOS 6.1.6 on February 21, 2014, as iOS 7 drops support for devices with less than 512MB of RAM. The last operating system update Apple provided for an Apple TV containing an A4 (that being the second-generation Apple TV) was Apple TV Software 6.2.1, which was released on September 17, 2014.

== Design ==
Apple engineers designed the A4 chip with an emphasis on being "extremely powerful yet extremely power efficient." The A4 features a single-core ARM Cortex-A8 central processing unit (CPU) manufactured on Samsung's 45 nm fabrication process using performance enhancements developed by chip designer Intrinsity (which was subsequently acquired by Apple) in collaboration with Samsung. The resulting CPU, dubbed "Hummingbird", is able to run at a far higher clock rate than previous Cortex-A8 CPUs while remaining fully compatible with the Cortex-A8 design provided by ARM. The same Cortex-A8 used in the A4 is also used in Samsung's S5PC110A01 SoC. The A4 also features a single-core PowerVR SGX535 graphics processing unit (GPU). The die of the A4 takes up 53.3 mm^{2} of area.

The clock rate of the Cortex-A8 in the A4 used inside the first-generation iPad is 1 GHz. The clock rate of the Cortex-A8 in the A4 used inside the iPhone 4 and fourth-generation iPod Touch is 800 MHz (underclocked from 1 GHz). It is unknown what the clock rate of the Cortex-A8 in the A4 used inside the second-generation Apple TV is.

The A4 uses the PoP method of installation to support RAM. The top package of the A4 used inside the first-generation iPad, the fourth-generation iPod Touch, and the second-generation Apple TV contains two 128 MB LPDDR chips, providing a total of 256 MB of RAM. The top package of the A4 used inside the iPhone 4 contains two 256 MB LPDDR chips, providing a total of 512 MB of RAM. The RAM is connected to the A4 using ARM's 64 bit wide AMBA 3 AXI bus.

== Products featuring the Apple A4 ==
- iPad (1st generation)
- iPhone 4
- iPod Touch (4th generation)
- Apple TV (2nd generation)

== Gallery ==
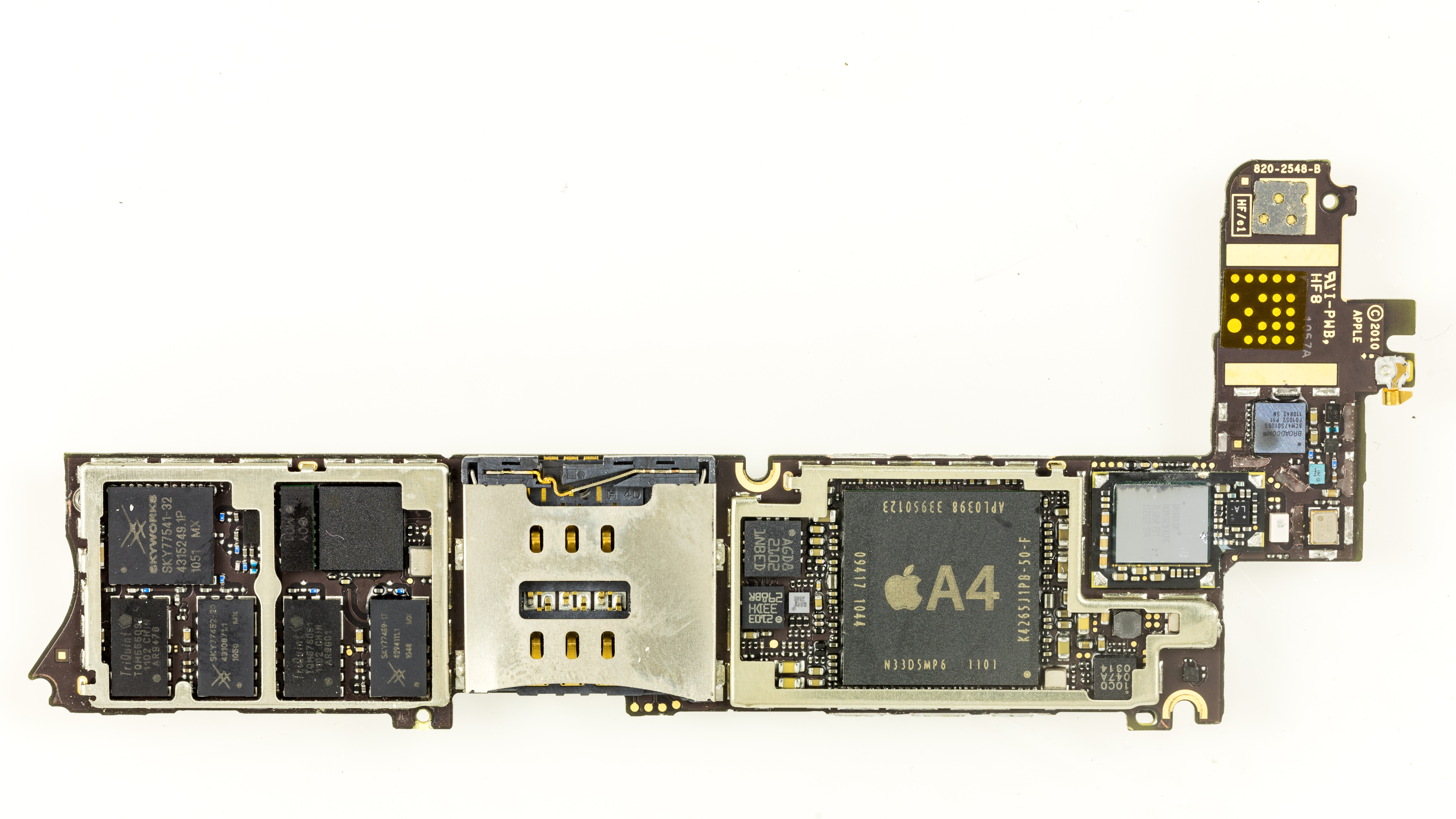
iPhone 4 Main Logic Board with Apple A4 SoC

== See also ==
- Apple silicon, the range of ARM-based SoCs designed by Apple
- PWRficient, a series of microprocessors designed by P.A. Semi. Apple acquired P.A. Semi to form an in-house custom chip design department.
