= Samsung M920 Transform =

Android smartphone manufactured by Samsung

Samsung Transform (SPH-M920)
- Manufacturer: Samsung Group
- Availability by region: October 10, 2010
- Predecessor: Samsung Intercept
- Successor: Samsung Transform Ultra
- Compatible networks: CDMA, EVDO Rev. A
- Form factor: Slider
- Dimensions: 4.61 in (117 mm) (h); 2.42 in (61 mm) (w); 0.61 in (15 mm) (d)
- Weight: 5.37 oz (152 g)
- Operating system: Android 2.1 or Android 2.2, Sprint ID
- CPU: 800 MHz, Samsung S3C6410, Qualcomm QSC6085
- Memory: 256 MB RAM / 512 MB ROM
- Removable storage: MicroSD support
- Battery: 1500 mAh
- Rear camera: 3.2 Megapixels with LED Flash
- Front camera: VGA
- Display: 320 x 480 px, 3.5 in. TFT LCD
- Connectivity: Bluetooth 3.0
- Data inputs: Touchscreen, physical keyboard
- SAR: 0.75 W/KG @ 1g (head), 0.82 W/KG @ 1g (body)
- Hearing aid compatibility: M4

The Samsung SPH-M920 (marketed as the Samsung Transform) is an Android smartphone manufactured by Samsung. It was announced on October 6, 2010 and released on October 10, 2010 for Sprint in the United States.

The Samsung Transform was released using Android 2.1 (Eclair), but received an update to version 2.2.2 on March 25, 2011.

The Transform is one of the first devices to be equipped with Sprint's "Sprint ID" user interface. It's considered a mid-range smartphone and the successor to the Samsung Intercept with a few upgrades including faster data (EVDO Rev. A), a larger 3.5" inch touchscreen, and a VGA front-facing camera for video calling (expected to work with 2.2 update). The phone's form factor resembles that of the Samsung Epic 4G and is being offered as a 'budget minded' alternative.

== Samsung Transform Ultra (SPH-M930) ==
In September 2011, Sprint announced the Samsung Transform Ultra, an updated version to the original Transform that features a faster 1GHz processor and physical navigational keys, Sprint subsidiary Boost Mobile began offering the smartphone on October 7 and Sprint said it would carry it at a later date.

== See also ==
- List of Android devices
- Android OS
- Galaxy Nexus
