= Early iPhone systems-on-chip =

Chips used for the first iPhones

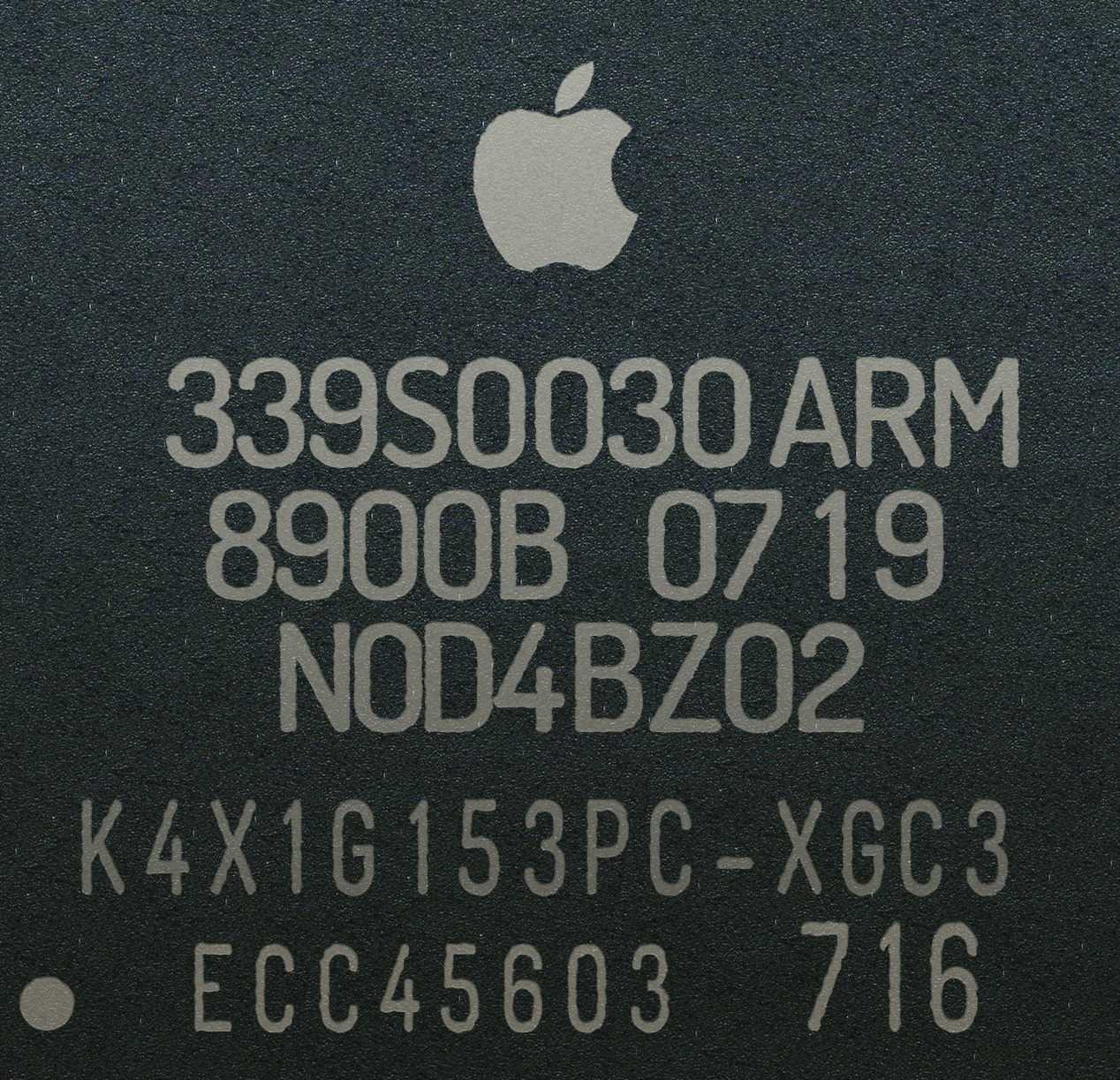
- The S5L8900 system on a chip (SoC)

General information
- Launched: 2007
- Designed by: Samsung Electronics, based on specifications by Apple Inc.
- Common manufacturer: Samsung Electronics

iPhone and iPod Touch models released between 2007 and 2009 used system on a chip (SoC) circuits designed by Samsung and manufactured to Apple's specifications. Two such SoCs were used: the Samsung S5L8900, used in the first-generation iPhone, the iPhone 3G, and the first-generation iPod Touch, and the Samsung S5L8920, used in the iPhone 3GS and the third-generation iPod Touch. Both chips belong to Samsung's S5L family of SoCs.

Apple later switched to in-house designed Apple silicon SoCs, starting with the Apple A4.

== History ==
In 2006, Apple introduced the 2nd generation iPod nano and the iPod Classic. The iPhone, internally called Project Purple, was also in development. Apple needed new SoCs for this planned expansion of the product range, so the S5L87 SoCs were created for the less power-hungry iPod family, and - after initial iPhone prototypes with a Freescale i.MX31 SoC, the S5L89 SoCs were adopted. The S5L87 SoCs were the successors of the PortalPlayer processors used in the iPod until then. Initially, there were no plans to run third-party software on S5L89 SoCs. Accordingly, the GPUs were designed to prioritize energy efficiency over power. This changed with the introduction of the App Store. As a result, Apple bought the chip design company P.A. Semi in 2008 and developed the almost identical S5L8922 and S5L8930 (Apple A4) SoCs to meet increased power requirements. Since 2010, Apple has marketed the S5L89 series as the "Apple A" chip series, starting with the Apple A4 (S5L8930).

=== Intel's chip supply attempt ===
In the years leading up to the original iPhone's launch, Intel was in talks with Apple to use Intel x86 chips for the iPhone's processor, instead of ARM. In his autobiography, Steve Jobs claimed that Apple rejected this option due to Intel being too organizationally "slow", and a desire to avoid strengthening Apple's competitors. Intel's CEO Paul Otellini claims the two companies were unable to agree on price and were unwilling to give up control over the chip's design. Otellini later explained that he turned down the deal due to low expected sales, which would not have made up for forecasted costs, and said that "in hindsight, the forecasted cost was wrong and the volume was 100x what anyone thought."

In 2016, Intel laid off 12,000 workers. The company's failure to "pivot into mobile" was seen by some reporters as a key factor.

== Samsung SoCs ==
=== S5L8900 ===
The Samsung S5L8900 is a 32-bit system on a chip (SoC) manufactured by Samsung for Apple. It combines an ARM CPU with a PowerVR graphics processor. The first product to feature the chip was the original iPhone, followed by the iPod Touch, and iPhone 3G.

Other names for the S5L8900 are ARM 8900B and APL0098. It belongs to Samsung's S5L family of SoCs.

The S5L8900 contains a 32-bit ARMv6 compatible ARM 1176JZF-S CPU core and is manufactured in the 90 nm CMOS process. The default clock rate of the CPU core is normally 666.6 MHz, but has been lowered by Apple to about 412 MHz, and the bus frequency is about 103 MHz. The size of the level 1 cache is 16 KiB each for data and instruction cache. It makes use of 128 MiB eDRAM. As SoC, S5L8900 also has an integrated GPU, a PowerVR MBX LITE clocked at 60 MHz. The S5L8900 thus supports OpenGL 1.1. NOR flash is used to initiate the processor start.

Competing architectures of similar products are Qualcomm's Snapdragon, Texas Instruments' OMAP 4, Nvidia's Tegra 2 and Samsung's Exynos.

The last operating system update Apple provided for a mobile device containing an S5L8900 (iPhone 3G) was iOS 4.2.1, which was released on November 22, 2010.

=== S5L8720 ===
The Samsung S5L8720 is a 32-bit system on a chip (SoC) manufactured by Samsung for Apple. It is used in the iPod touch (2nd generation). It is similar to the S5L8900.

=== S5L8920 ===
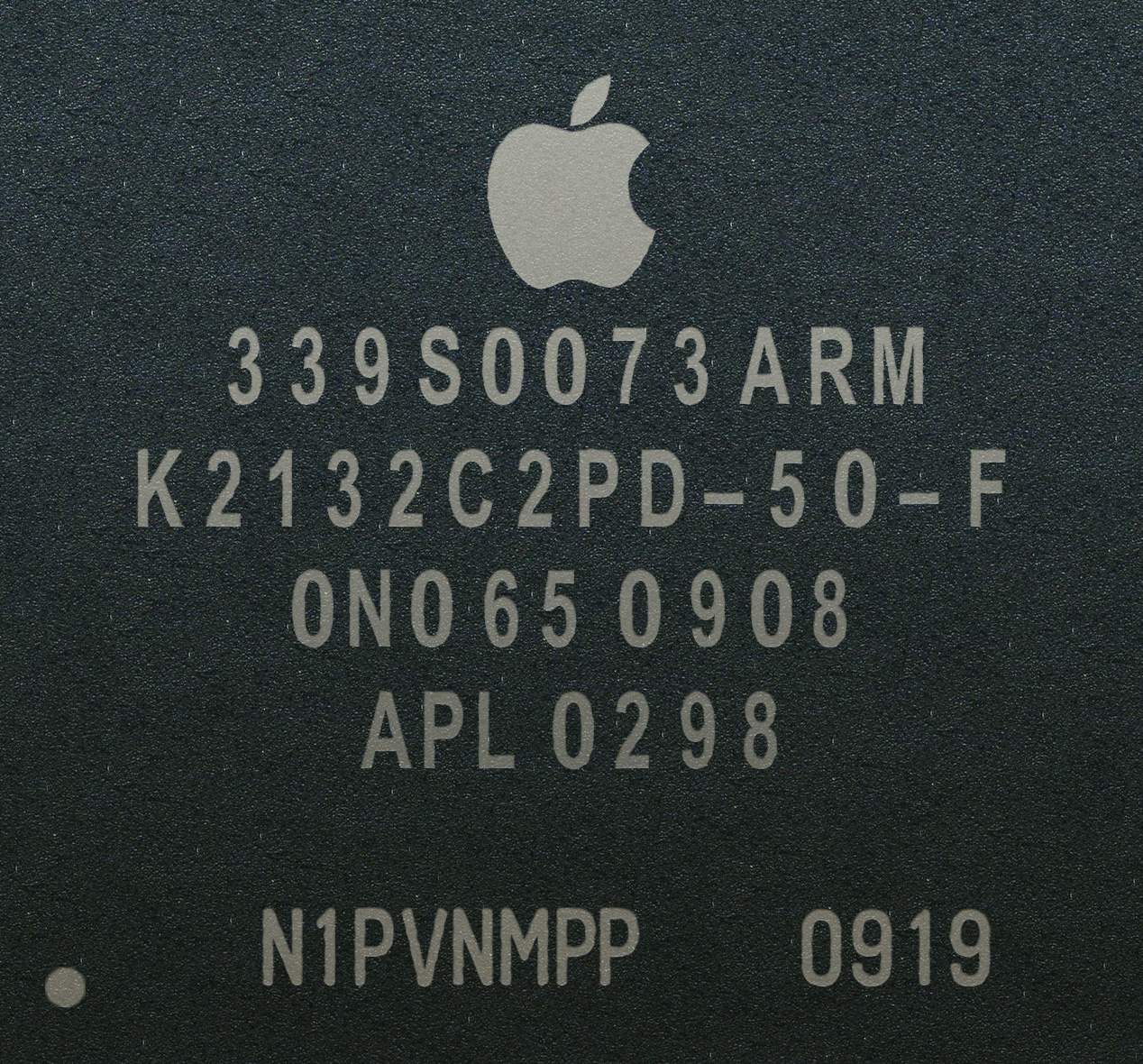
The S5L8920 chip used in the iPhone 3GS

The Samsung S5L8920 is a 32-bit system on a chip (SoC) manufactured by Samsung for Apple. The only iPhone to use it was the iPhone 3GS, before being replaced with the Apple A4 with the release of the iPhone 4. The chip is an updated version of the S5L8900 with more processing power. As a result, the iPhone 3GS was widely praised for its increased CPU and GPU performance.

The S5L8920 contains an ARM Cortex-A8 main processor that is compatible with 32-bit Armv7, and backward compatible with ARMv6. It is manufactured in the 65 nm CMOS process. The standard Cortex-A8 clock rate is normally 833 MHz, but has been lowered by Apple to around 600 MHz. It doubles memory size to 256 MiB. Like its predecessor SoCs, the S5L8920 also has an integrated GPU, a PowerVR SGX535. The S5L8920 thus supports OpenGL 2.0, OpenGL ES 2.0, OpenGL ES 1.1 with the Extension Pack and OpenVG 1.0.1 & 1.1. A NOR flash is used to boot the processor.

Similar competing architectures include Qualcomm's Snapdragon, Texas Instruments' OMAP 4, Nvidia's Tegra 2 and Samsung's Exynos.

The last operating system that supported the S5L8920 chip was iOS 6.1.6, which was released on February 21, 2014.

=== S5L8922 ===
The Samsung S5L8922 is a 32-bit system on a chip (SoC) manufactured by Samsung for Apple. It is used in the iPod touch (3rd generation). It is similar to the S5L8920.

== Later developments ==
Apple later switched to designing their chips in-house after their acquisition of Intrinsity and PA Semi, leading to the creation of the Apple A4 used in the iPhone 4.
