= Propeller (disambiguation) =

A propeller is a mechanical device that converts rotational motion into thrust.

Propeller may also refer to:

- Propeller (aeronautics)

== Music ==
- Propeller Records, a record label
- Propeller (band), an Estonian punk band
- Propellers (band), an English band
- Propeller (Guided by Voices album) (1992)
- Propeller (Peter Stuart album) (2002)

== Other uses ==
- Propeller (theatre company), a UK theatre group
- Propeller TV, a British television channel
- Propeller.com, a social news website operated by AOL
- Parallax Propeller, a microcontroller
- The Propeller, defunct Australian newspaper
- Propeller Knight, a boss in Shovel Knight
- Propeller Mushroom, a power-up in New Super Mario Bros. Wii
- Variable-pitch propellers (marine)

== See also ==
- Beta-propeller, a protein fold
