= Samsung A767 Propel =

Mobile phone model

SGH-A767 (Propel)
- Manufacturer: Samsung Electronics
- Successor: SGH-i627 Propel Pro
- Compatible networks: Quad-Band: GSM 850/900/1800/1900MHz; Dual-Band: UMTS 850/1900MHz
- Form factor: slide out keypad
- Dimensions: 3.85” x 2.33” x .58”
- Weight: 3.79 oz (107 g)
- Operating system: Standard At&T
- Memory: 500 MB shared
- Removable storage: microSD
- Battery: 1000 mAhr Lithium-Ion
- Rear camera: 1.3 megapixel
- Display: 220 x 176 px, 2.2 in (5.6 cm)
- Connectivity: Bluetooth
- Data inputs: QWERTY keypad

The Samsung SGH-A767, more commonly known as the Samsung Propel, is a mobile phone by Samsung Telecommunications. It features a full QWERTY keyboard that slides out from under the phone. It comes in white, blue, red, and green, and is one of AT&T's most popular cell phones. It was designed as a quick texting phone along with the Pantech Matrix, the Pantech Slate, and the UT Starcom Quickfire.

The Samsung SGH-A767's QWERTY keyboard makes texting and any other task that requires using letters, numbers, and symbols, much easier and faster to complete. However, the size of the keyboard can be a drawback for people with large hands because the keys are flush mounted and close to each other. Another downside is the screen resolution, which only has 65,000 colors. Along with the standard features of most phones, the Samsung SGH-A767 has GPS capability, with both audible and visual aide which is Java based. It is, however, a separately licensed product, requiring both downloading the program and paying extra for data services.

Music and other multimedia capabilities are included with the Samsung SGH-A767. The microSD slot allows you to transfer music and pictures from a computer to your phone, while adding extra memory. The AT&T Music feature allows you to download and play music and ringtones. Recorded audio and playlists can also be played. Supported audio file extensions are AAC (Advanced Audio Coding), AAC+, eAAC+, MP3, WMA (Windows Media Audio), 3GP, MPEG, MP4, and M4A.

== Tips and tricks ==
=== Advanced menu ===
To enter into an advanced menu not available from the normal menu a special code is typed in. To reach this menu enter in this code: *#6984125*# This menu should contain:

- Software Version
- Pre-configuration
- Network & call settings
- Internals
