= List of Samsung systems on a chip =

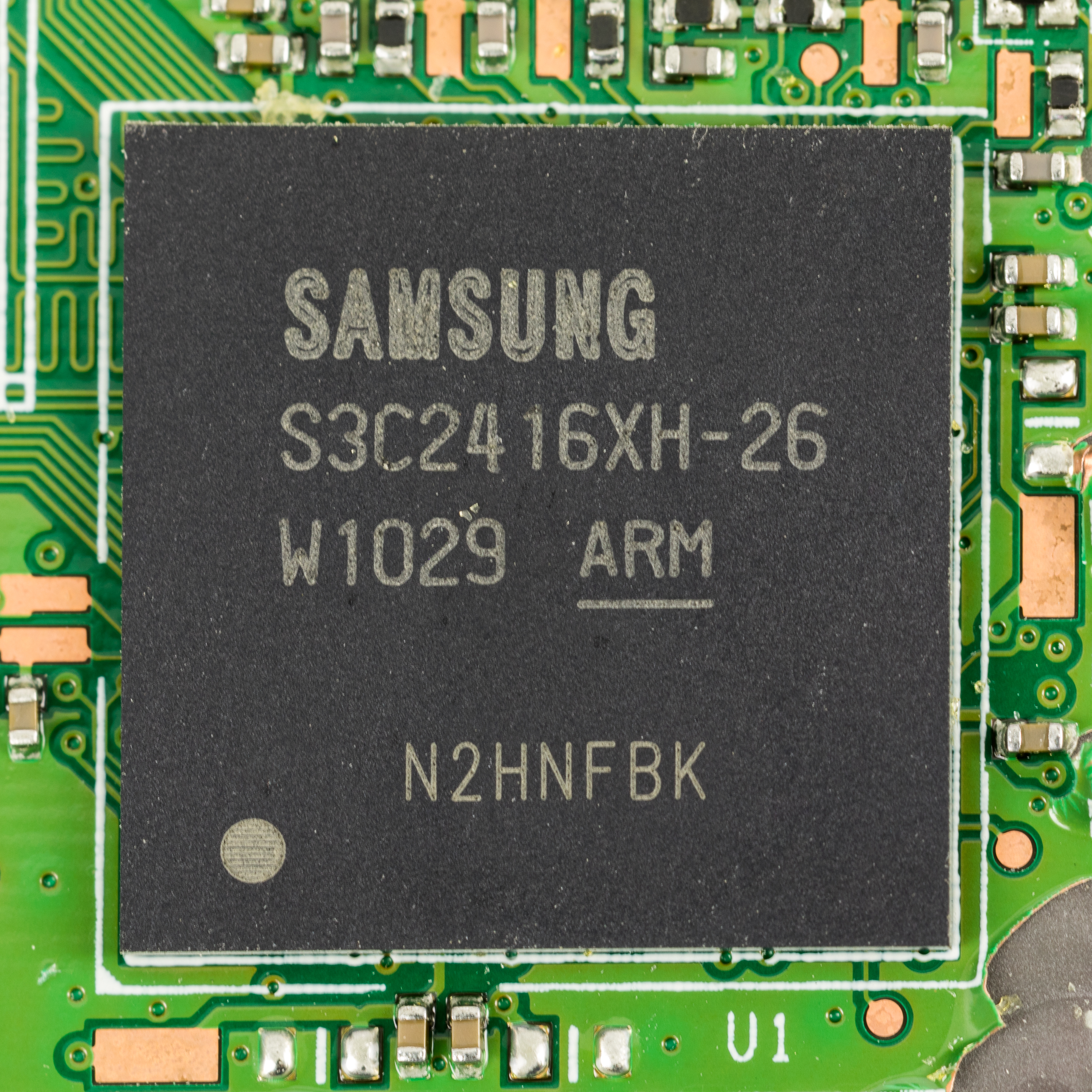
Samsung S3C2416XH-26

Samsung has a long history of designing and producing system-on-chips (SoCs) and has been manufacturing SoCs for its own devices as well as for sale to other manufacturers. The first Samsung SoC, the S3C44B0, was built around an ARM7 CPU which operated at 66 MHz clock frequency. Later, several SoCs (S3C2xxx) containing an ARM9 CPU were produced. For more information on Samsung's current SoCs, see Exynos.

== List of historical Samsung SoCs ==
Model Number	Semiconductor technology	CPU instruction set	CPU	GPU	FPU	Memory technology	Availability	Utilizing devices
S3C44B0	0.25 μm CMOS	ARMv4	66 MHz single-core ARM7 (ARM7TDMI)	LCD controller		FP, EDO, SDRAM	2000	Juice Box, Danger Hiptop
S5L2010		ARMv5	176 MHz single-core ARM9 (ARM946E-S)	LCD controller		SDRAM, EDO		
S3C2410	0.18 μm CMOS	ARMv4	200/266 MHz single-core ARM9 (ARM920T)	LCD controller		SDRAM	2003	HP iPAQ H1930/H1937/H1940/rz1717, HP 49g+/48gII/50g, Everex E500, E-TEN InfoTouch P300, Acer n30/n35/d155, Palm Z22, LG LN600, Typhoon MyGuide 3610 GO, Samsung S5230, Openmoko Neo1973, Verifone Omni 3750
S3C2412	0.13 μm CMOS	ARMv5	200/266 MHz single-core ARM9 (ARM926EJ-S)	LCD controller		mSDRAM		Argox PT-60, TomTom One/One XL/XXL
S3C2413	0.13 μm LP	ARMv5	266 MHz single-core ARM9 (ARM926EJ-S)	LCD controller		mSDRAM, mDDR		
S3C2440	0.13 μm CMOS	ARMv4	300/400/533 MHz single-core ARM9 (ARM920T)	LCD controller		SDRAM	2004	HP iPAQ rx3115/3415/3417/3715, Everex E900, Airis T470i/920/930, Acer n300/311, Boardcon EM2440-III, Typhoon MyPhone M500, Mio p550/P350/C710 Digi-Walker, A9home
S3C2442	0.13 μm CMOS	ARMv4	300/400 MHz single-core ARM9 (ARM920T)	LCD controller		mSDRAM		Openmoko Neo Freerunner, HP IPAQ rx1950
S5L8701		ARMv6	Single-core ARM9 (ARM940T)	LCD controller		SDRAM	2006	iPod nano (2nd generation)
S3C2443		ARMv4	400/533 MHz single-core ARM9 (ARM920T)	LCD controller		SDRAM, mSDRAM, mDDR	2007	Asus R300/R600/R700, Mio Digi-Walker (C620T/...), Mio Moov 2xx/3xx, LG LN8xx, JoinTech JPro Mini Laptop JL7220, Navigon 8300/8310, Navman F15
S5L8900	90 nm	ARMv6	412 MHz single-core ARM11 (ARM1176JZF-S)	PowerVR MBX Lite		SDRAM	2007	Apple iPhone, Apple iPod touch 1G, Apple iPhone 3G
S5L8702		ARMv6	Single-core ARM9 (ARM926EJ-S)	LCD controller		SDRAM	2007	iPod nano (3rd generation), iPod classic (6th generation)
S3C2416	65 nm LP	ARMv5	400 MHz single-core ARM9 (ARM926EJ)	2D graphics accelerator		SDRAM, mSDRAM, mDDR, DDR2	2008	Boardcon Handheld POS, iconX G310, HP Prime
S3C2450	65 nm LP CMOS	ARMv5	400/533 MHz single-core ARM9 (ARM926EJ)	2D graphics accelerator		SDRAM, mSDRAM, mDDR, DDR2	2008	Mio Moov 500/510/560/S568/580, Getac PS535F, MENQ EasyPC E720/E790, Archos Arnova 10, Hivision PWS0890AW, SMiT MTV-PND530 8GB
S5L8720	90 nm	ARMv6	Single-core ARM11 (ARM1176JZF-S)	LCD controller (iPod nano), PowerVR MBX Lite (iPod touch)		SDRAM	2008	iPod nano (4th generation), iPod touch (2nd generation)
S3C6410	65 nm LP	ARMv6	533/667/800 MHz single-core ARM11 (ARM1176ZJF-S)	FIMG 3DSE graphics accelerator	Yes	mSDRAM, mDDR	2009	Samsung i8000 Omnia II, Samsung S5620 Monte, Boardcon SBC6410
S5L8730	90 nm	ARMv6	Single-core ARM11 (ARM1176JZF-S)	LCD controller		SDRAM	2009	iPod nano (5th generation)
S5P6422		ARMv6	533/667 MHz single-core ARM11	FIMG 3DSE graphics accelerator				Samsung Galaxy 3
S5P6442	45 nm	ARMv6	533/667 MHz single-core ARM11	FIMG 3DSE graphics accelerator			2010	
S5P6450		ARMv6	533/667/800 MHz single-core ARM11 (ARM1176JZF-S)	3D graphics accelerator		mDDR, mDDR2, LPDDR	2010	
S5L8723			Single-core ARM11	LCD controller		SDRAM	2010	iPod nano (6th generation)
S5PC100	65 nm	ARMv7	667/833 MHz single-core ARM Cortex-A8	PowerVR SGX535	Yes	LPDDR2, DDR2	2009	iPhone 3GS
S5PC110 (later renamed to Exynos Single 3110)	45 nm	ARMv7	1.0-1.2 GHz single-core FastCore Cortex-A8	PowerVR SGX540	Yes	LPDDR, LPDDR2, DDR2	2010	Samsung Galaxy S etc. (See Exynos)
S5L8740			Single-core	LCD controller			2012	iPod nano (7th generation)
