= Samsung M900 Moment =

Android smartphone introduced in 2009

Samsung Moment (SPH-M900)
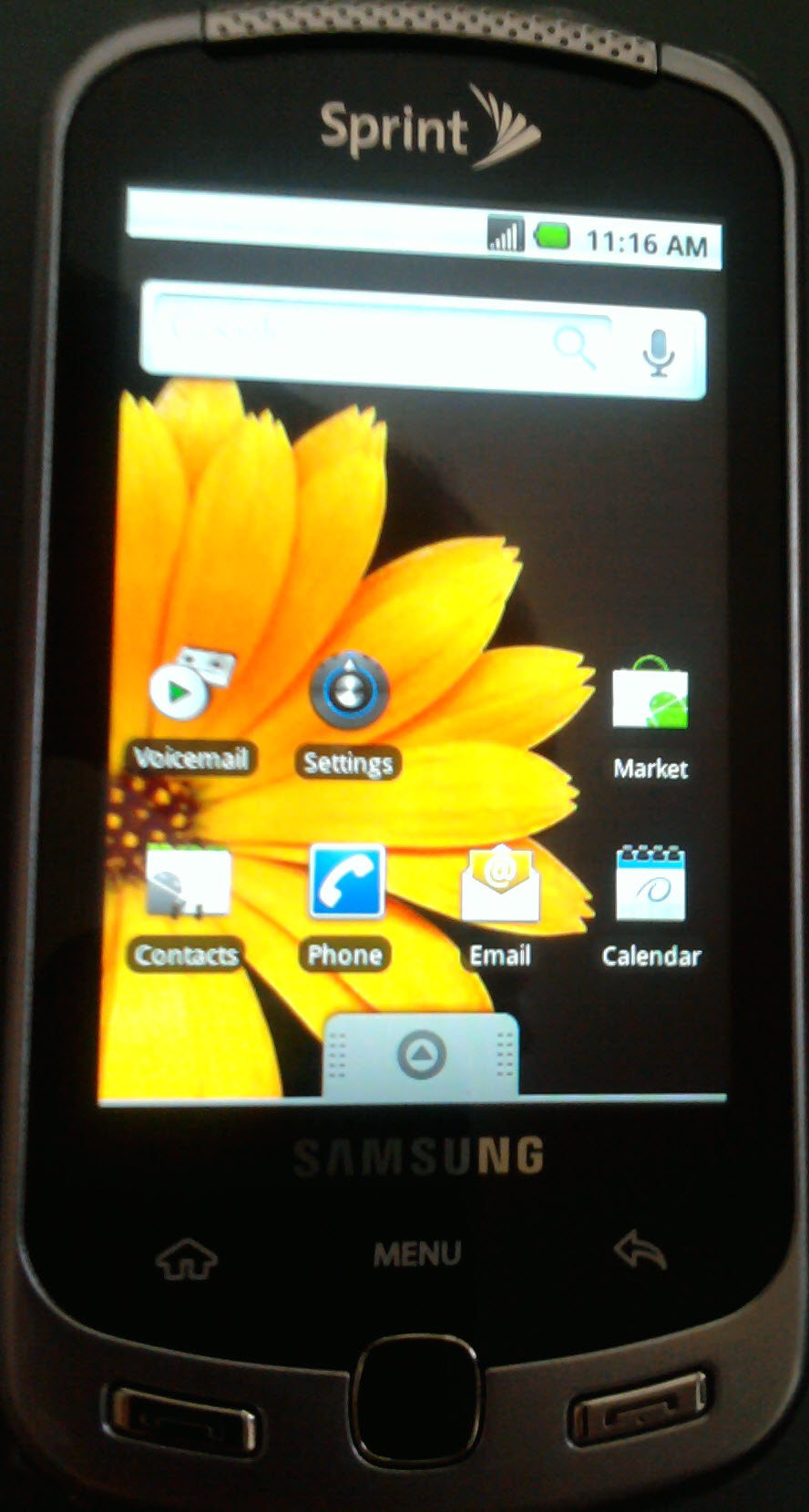
- Manufacturer: Samsung
- Availability by region: November 1, 2009
- Successor: Samsung Intercept
- Compatible networks: CDMA EV-DO Rev. A
- Form factor: Slider
- Dimensions: 4.60 x 2.34 x 0.63 inches (117 x 59 x 16 mm)
- Weight: 161 g (6 oz)
- Operating system: Android 2.1 Eclair
- CPU: Samsung S3C6410 at 800 MHz
- Memory: 256 MB RAM
- Storage: 512 MB ROM, 223 MB for application storage
- Removable storage: micro-SD/microSDHC support
- Battery: 1440 mAh
- Rear camera: 3.2 mega-pixels w/ auto-focus and flash
- Display: 320 x 480 px, 3.2 in. 16M-color HVGA AMOLED capacitive touch screen
- Connectivity: Bluetooth 2.1, Wi-Fi (802.11b/g)
- Data inputs: Touch Screen, physical keyboard, 5-way optical pad, accelerometer, proximity sensor
- Hearing aid compatibility: M4

The Samsung Moment, known as SPH-M900, is a smartphone manufactured by Samsung that uses the open source Android operating system.

== Features ==
The phone features a 3.2-inch 16M-color AMOLED capacitive touchscreen and a 3.2-megapixel autofocus camera. Compared to Sprint's version of the HTC Hero, the device offers a left-sliding QWERTY keyboard with Search Key, four-way navigation with arrow keys, a faster processor, and more available user-accessible memory; however, the Moment has a lower-capacity battery and its touchscreen hardware does not offer multi-touch support. An exclusive custom version with an internal MobileTV antenna and external antenna jack was released in 2010 in the Washington, D.C./Delaware metro area for a public field test of the Mobile ATSC standard.

The base of the Moment's Android 1.5 interface is identical to the unmodified Android install in T-Mobile's G1 phone; built-in software includes Mobile Google services such as Google Search, Gmail, YouTube, Google Calendar, and Google Talk. Building from that, Samsung added Moxier Mail (POP/IMAP Support, Microsoft Exchange access) and Nuance VoiceControl, while Sprint installed NFL Mobile, NASCAR Sprint Cup, Sprint Navigation, and Sprint TV.

In May 2010, Sprint made an update to Android 2.1 (Eclair) available on its website, then announced in June via Twitter that the Moment and HTC Hero would not be upgraded to Android 2.2 (Froyo).

== Issues ==
As of the latest Android 2.1 build DJ07, the Samsung Moment, the Samsung Intercept, and the Samsung Transform (all based on the same SoC) do not include support for OpenGL ES 1.1 or 2.0 (in Android 2.2) despite hardware support for it. A community led complete rewrite of the g3d drivers is in development. Samsung Moment and Intercept users have also been reporting issues of data and airplane mode lock up over the CDMA network while using various browsers, streaming software such as YouTube and Pandora, and even randomly for seemingly no reason. The data/airplane mode lock up also prevents making voice calls and forces user to restart the phone to have connections restored. Enabling wifi radio while using CDMA network makes the issue more frequent. GPS has also been a "hit or miss" feature on the Samsung Moment, as some devices have perfectly working GPS, others have semi-working GPS, and yet others have completely dead GPS altogether.

== Controversy ==
Despite various software updates from Sprint, the previously mentioned issues have remained unfixed on most handsets, leading some customers to believe that the issues are due to defective hardware, rather than software, many customers have pushed to get a replacement phone of equal value from Sprint, but the only phones officially offered as replacements (and even then, only if at least three exchanges have occurred within six months) are the Samsung Intercept and HTC Hero, both of which are considered downgrades to the Moment. Some customers also claim that they were often lied to when confronting Sprint on the issue, often being told that the data lockup and GPS bugs are not known issues, even though the official Samsung Moment update log on Sprint's website lists three different updates meant to address the issues. Customers have also accused Sprint and Samsung of violating FCC regulations, as the data lockup prevents both outgoing and incoming calls, including 911, unless the phone is restarted. It has also been speculated that this is the reason that the Samsung Moment was silently discontinued, despite Sprint's official statement that the release of the Samsung Intercept and Samsung Transform were the reason for the Moment's discontinuation. As support for the Samsung Moment has officially ended, it is unlikely that the issues will be fixed unless by a third-party source.

== Specifications ==
Detailed technical specifications of the Samsung Moment SPH-M900:

- Processor: Samsung S3C6410 at 800 MHz
  - SetCPU app can change the speed to 66/133/266/400/800 MHz
- Memory: 256 MB of RAM and 512 MB of ROM (150 MB /system, 223 MB /data, 116 MB /cache)
  - Supports MicroSDHC. Official capacity up to 16 GB, comes with a 2 GB Class 2 card from factory.
- Connectivity: IEEE 802.11 b/g, Bluetooth 2.1 (HFP and A2DP), and MicroUSB 2.0 high-speed.
- Display: Capacitive, AMOLED touch-screen 3.2 inches 320×480.
- Text Input: A left-slide out keyboard as well as landscape and portrait on-screen keyboards.
- Camera: 3.2-megapixel camera with LED flash. Video recording (h.263 at 352x288).
- Audio: microphone, speaker phone, 3.5-mm headphone jack (compatible with standard stereo headphones, but also containing a fourth pin with microphone input).
- Operating system: Ships with Android OS 1.5. An update to Android 2.1 was released on May 14, 2010.

== Availability ==
The phone is available in the United States.

== See also ==
- Android OS
- Galaxy Nexus
