= The Propeller =

Australian newspaper

The Propeller, front page, 10 March 1911

The Propeller was a weekly English language newspaper published in Hurstville, New South Wales, Australia.

== Newspaper history ==
The Propeller began publication on 10 March 1911 and continued until 31 December 1969. It was published by the Wennholm Bros. It began with a print run of 2000 copies and was free of charge.

Its successor, the St George and Sutherland Shire Leader, was founded in 1960.

== Digitisation ==
The newspaper has been digitised as part of the Australian Newspapers Digitisation Program of the National Library of Australia.

== See also ==
- List of newspapers in Australia
- List of newspapers in New South Wales
