= Seagate FreeAgent =

Line of external hard drives by Seagate

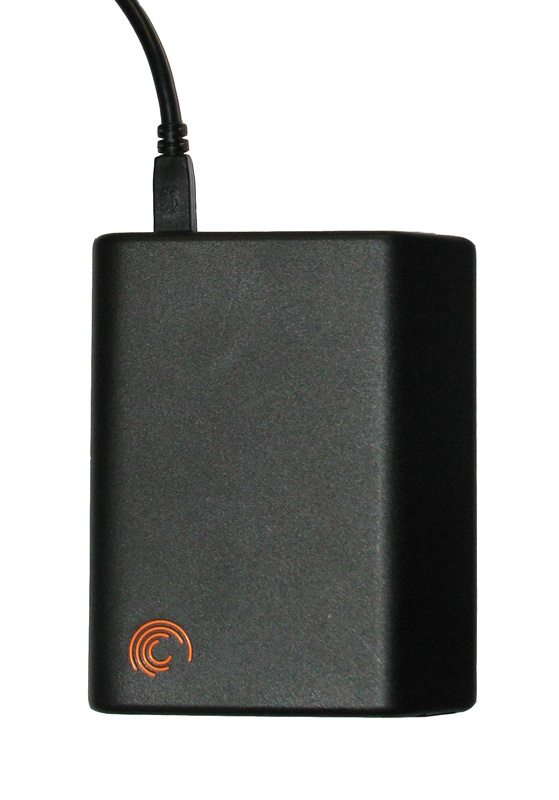
Seagate FreeAgent Go external hard disk drive.

New Seagate FreeAgent Go Special Edition(500gb)

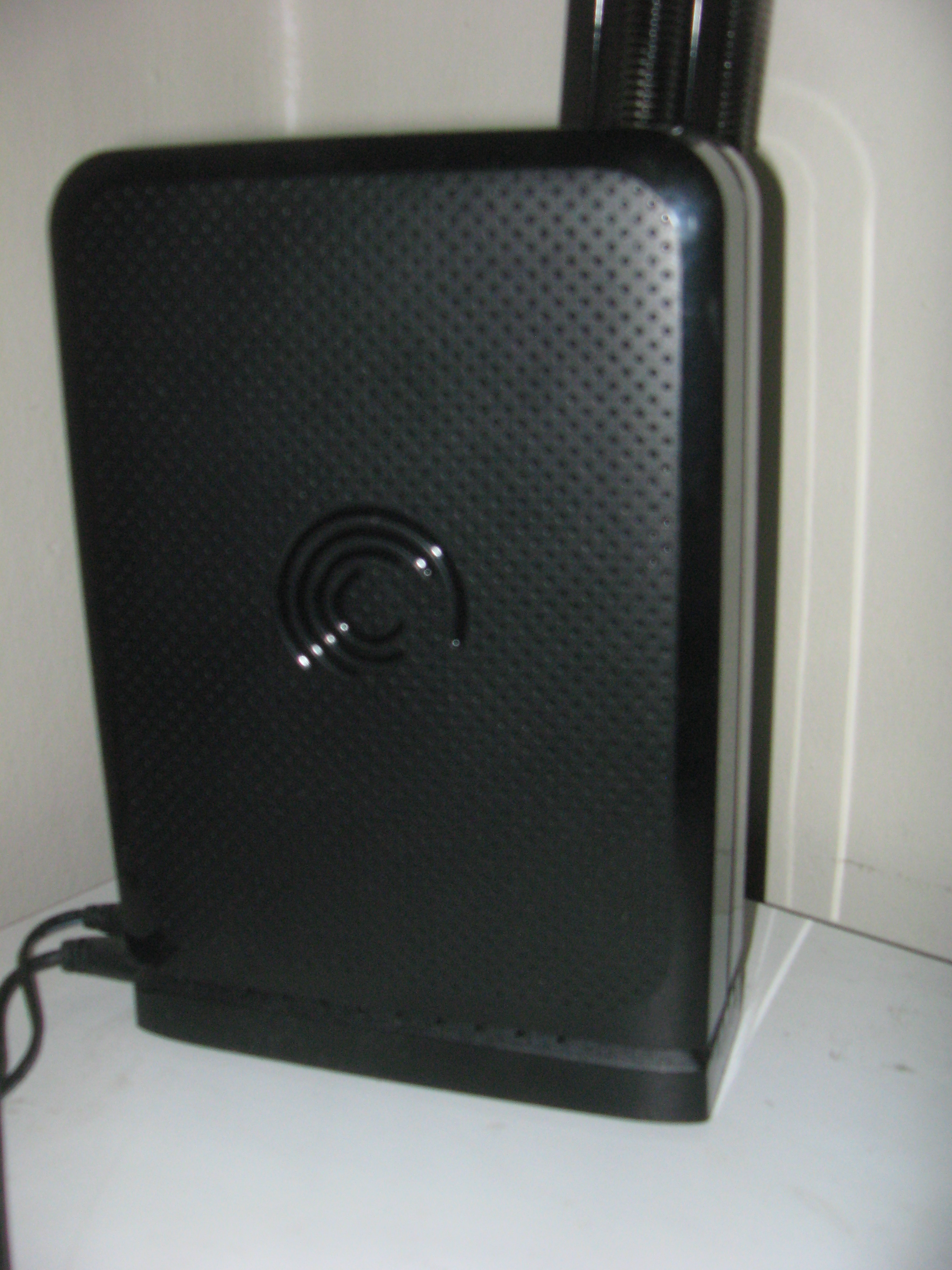
3.0 TB 3.5" Seagate FreeAgent GoFlex plug and play external USB 3.0-compatible drive

FreeAgent is a line of external hard drives manufactured by Seagate. They include FreeAgent Pro, FreeAgent Desktop, and FreeAgent Go. They range in size from 60 GB to 3 TB.

On May 20, 2010, Seagate released an updated range of FreeAgent drives. It includes the FreeAgent Desk, FreeAgent Go, FreeAgent GoFlex and FreeAgent Xtreme. The 3.5" drives have a maximum capacity of 2TB and the 2.5" Freeagent Go has a maximum of 1TB. The Go Special Edition is the same as the regular Go but with a different case. All the drives support USB 2.0, and the Xtreme also has 2 FireWire 400 ports and an eSATA port.

Mac versions of the drives have different designs and supporting FireWire 800, 400 and USB 2.0: the FreeAgent Go for Mac, FreeAgent Desk for Mac and the FreeAgent Go Pro for Mac.

While the drives may be supplied with different software and styling, any drive can be used as a storage device (without added functionality afforded by operating system-specific software) on any computer with appropriate port; for example, any USB 2.0 drive can be used on Mac or PC if an appropriate file system is installed on the drive and supported by the computer.

Other products released under the FreeAgent brand include the Dockstar, Theater+ HD Media player, and the Theater Media player.

In 2012, the FreeAgent line was renamed Backup Plus.

== GoFlex ==
The FreeAgent GoFlex drives support USB 2.0, USB 3.0 (backwards compatible with USB 2.0 ports), FireWire, and eSATAp (aka eSATA/USB or powered eSATA); they are supplied fitted with an adapter for one of these standards (often USB 2.0), or none (bare drive), and additional adapters can be purchased. There are two families of adapters, one for all 2.5" portable drives (without 12V support), and the other for all desktop drives. Any portable (or desktop) adapter can be used with any GoFlex portable (or desktop) drive interchangeably.
