= Samsung M910 Intercept =

Smartphone model

Samsung Intercept (SPH-M910)
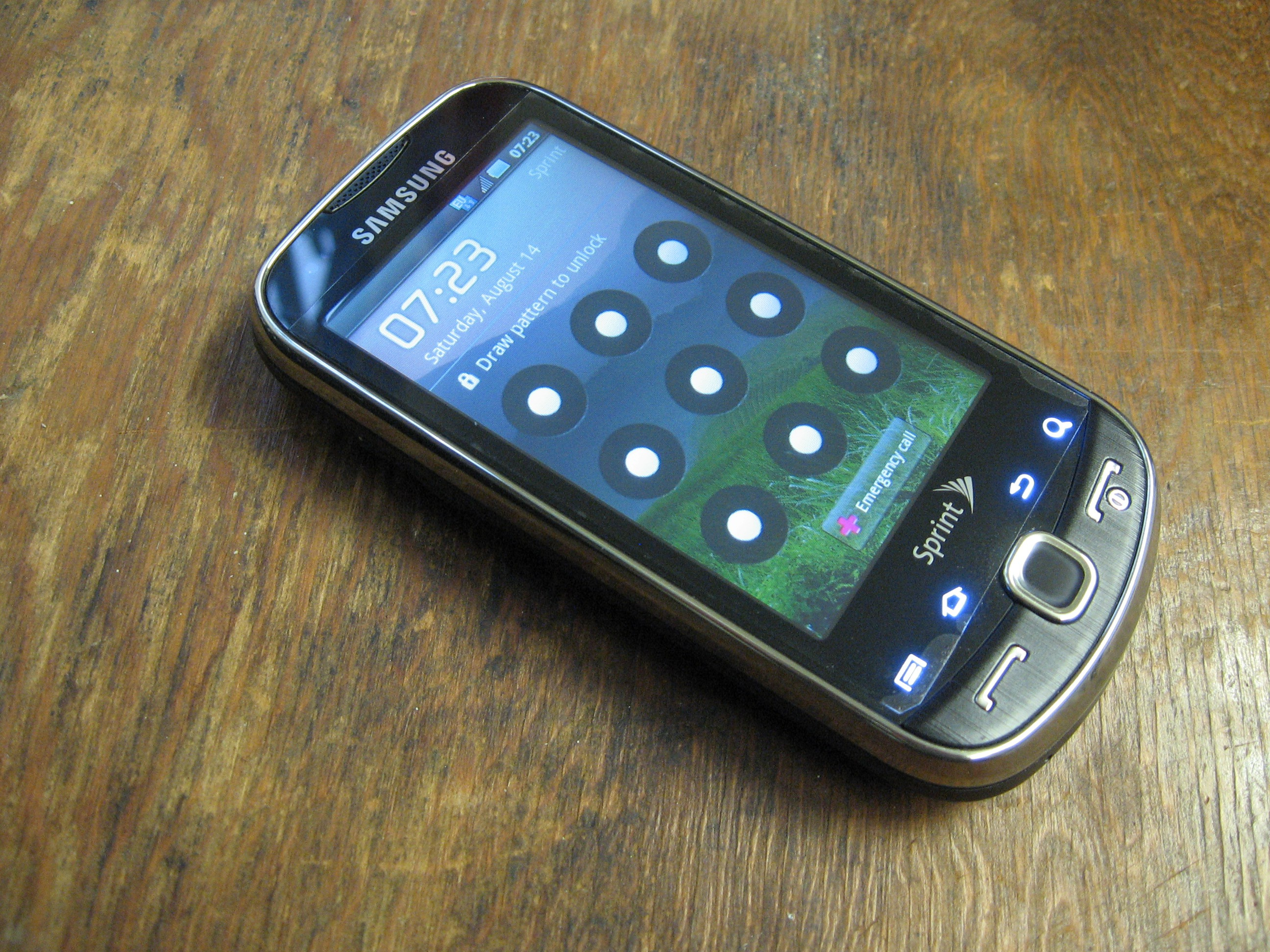
- Manufacturer: Samsung Group
- Availability by region: July 11, 2010
- Predecessor: Samsung Moment
- Successor: Samsung Transform
- Compatible networks: CDMA EVDO Rev. 0 (Sprint), CDMA EVDO Rev. A (Virgin Mobile)
- Form factor: Slider
- Dimensions: 4.43 in (113 mm) (h); 2.19 in (56 mm) (w); 0.59 in (15 mm) (d)
- Weight: 4.9 oz (140 g)
- Operating system: Android 2.1, upgradable to 2.2 As of 12/17/10 2.2 (Sprint) As of 4/11/11 2.2 (Virgin Mobile) Android 2.3 and 4.0 unofficially
- CPU: Samsung S3C6410 at 800 MHz
- Memory: 256 MB RAM
- Storage: 512 MB ROM
- Removable storage: MicroSD support
- Battery: 1500 mAh
- Rear camera: 3.2 Megapixels
- Front camera: No
- Display: 240 × 400 px, 3.0-in 16M-color TFT LCD
- Connectivity: Bluetooth 2.1, Wi-Fi (802.11 b/g)
- Data inputs: Touchscreen, physical keyboard, optical pad
- Hearing aid compatibility: M4

The Samsung SPH-M910 (marketed as the Samsung Intercept) is a discontinued Android smartphone manufactured by Samsung. It was released on July 11, 2010, for Sprint in the United States, and was also released on Sprint Nextel-owned prepaid cell phone company Virgin Mobile on October 4, 2010.

It was marketed as an updated version of the very similar Samsung Moment, though in several respects its features are inferior: its screen resolution of 240×400 is less than the 320×480 resolution of the Moment, it does not have a camera flash, and the Sprint version (but not the Virgin Mobile version) of the Intercept supports only EVDO Rev. 0 rather than the faster Rev. A standard supported by the Moment. Unlike the Moment, its touch screen does support multi-touch.

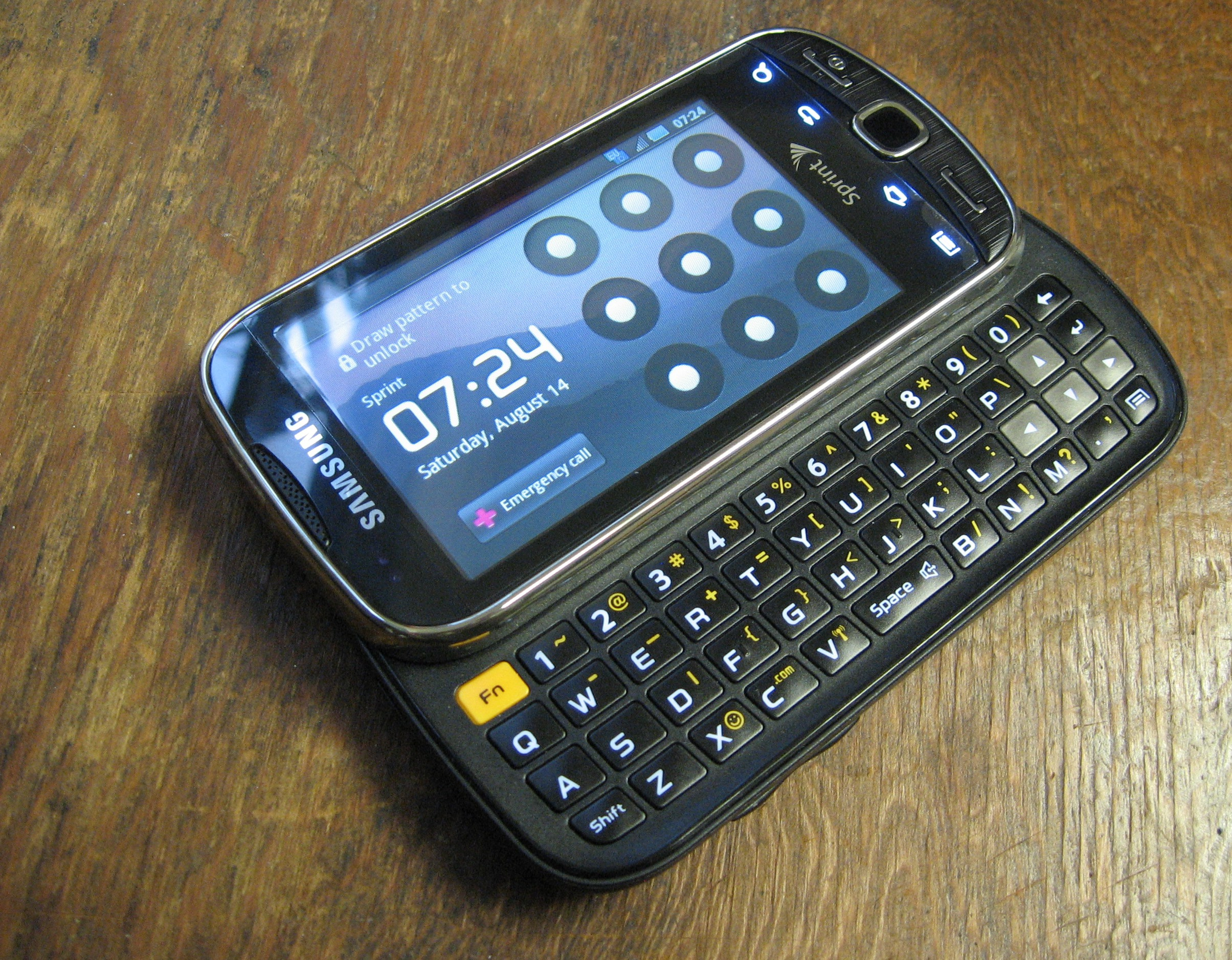
Samsung Intercept with keyboard open

Android enthusiasts created unofficial ports of Android 2.3 Gingerbread and Android 4.0 Ice Cream Sandwich to run on the SPH-M910.

A Micro-USB port is provided for charging the battery and data connectivity.
