= Samsung SGH-i780 =

Mobile phone model

Samsung SGH-i780 (Mirage)
- Manufacturer: Samsung Electronics
- Availability by region: January 2008
- Compatible networks: Triband GSM
- Form factor: candybar
- Dimensions: 115×61×12.9 mm (4.53×2.40×0.51 in)
- Weight: 120 g
- Operating system: Windows Mobile 6.1
- CPU: Marvell PXA310 612 MHz
- Removable storage: micro SDHC
- Battery: 1300 mAh
- Rear camera: 2.0 Mp
- Front camera: 0.3 Mp
- Display: 320×320
- Connectivity: WiFi, bluetooth 2.0
- Data inputs: qwerty keypad, touchscreen touchpad

The Samsung SGH-i780 or Samsung Mirage is a Windows Mobile-based smartphone manufactured by Samsung. The SGH-i780 has a candy bar-style design and a 320×320 resolution screen. A qwerty keyboard with the numeric keys overlaid on keys in the third to fifth column of the keyboard and the touch sensitive screen is used for input. In addition it has a small touchpad, which moves a cursor on the screen.

== Specifications ==
- Processor: Marvell PXA310 624 MHz
- Dimensions: 115 × 61 × 12.9 mm
- Weight: 120 g
- Operating system: Windows Mobile Professional 6.1
- RAM: 128 MB
- ROM: 256 MB
- Camera: 2.0 MP
- Front-facing camera: 0.3 MP
