= Samsung i627 Propel Pro =

Cell phone model

Samsung SGH-i627 (Propel Pro)
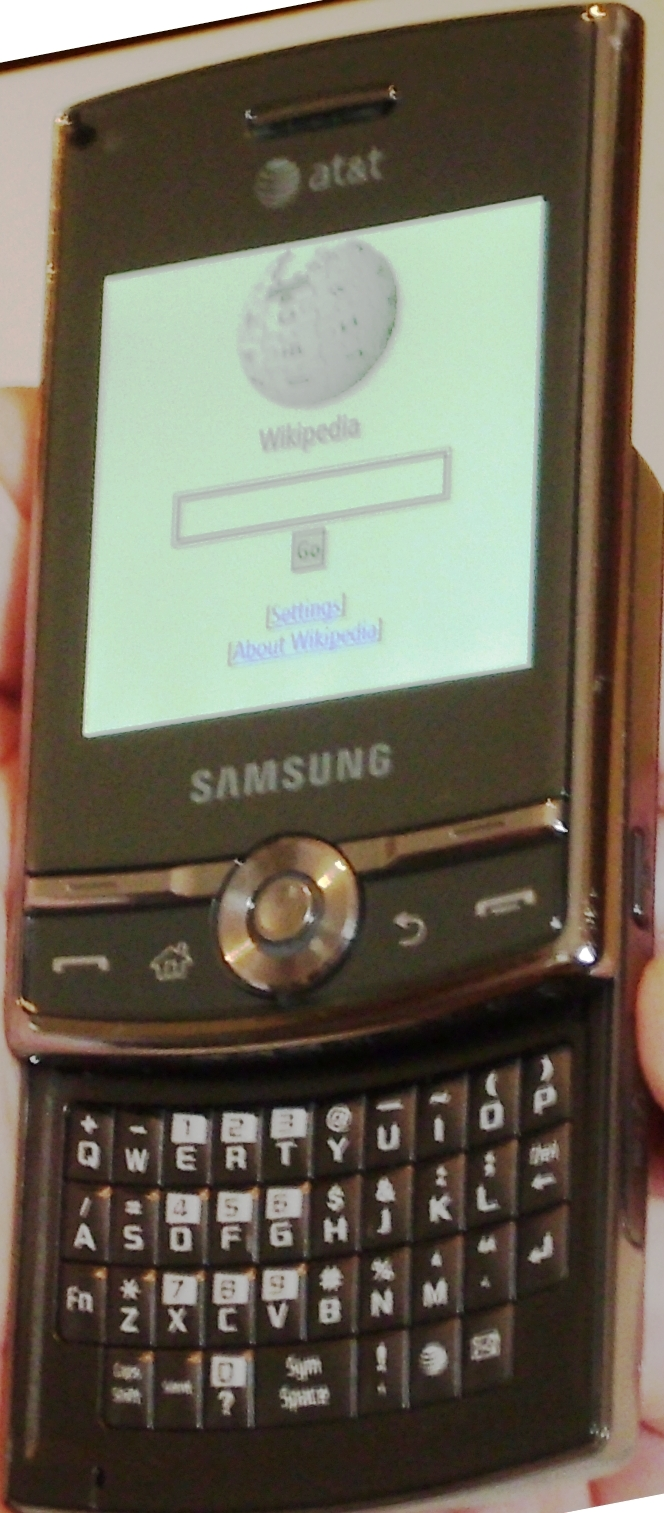
- Manufacturer: Samsung Electronics
- Availability by region: 2009; 17 years ago
- Compatible networks: HSDPA, GSM 850/900/1800/1900, UMTS 850/1900/2100, EDGE, GPRS
- Form factor: slider
- Dimensions: 61 × 99.4 × 16.7 millimetres (3.9 × 2.4 × 0.6 inches)
- Weight: 105 g (4.83 oz)
- Operating system: Windows Mobile 6.1 Standard
- CPU: 528 MHz Qualcomm MSM7201 ARM11
- Memory: 128 MB RAM/256 MB ROM
- Removable storage: MicroSD, MicroSDHC
- Battery: 3.7 V Lithium-ion 1,440 mAh
- Rear camera: 3.0 megapixel
- Display: 320 × 320 px, 65k colors
- Connectivity: Wi-Fi b/g, Bluetooth 2.0, USB 2.0 client, 12 Mbit/s mini-USB
- Data inputs: QWERTY keyboard
- Other: built-in GPS receiver

The Samsung SGH-i627 is a smartphone manufactured by Samsung, and sold in the United States as the Propel Pro by AT&T wireless. The phone sold for a price of $150 to $199.99 at launch. The phone was targeted towards business users.

== Specifications ==
The SGH-i627 is based on the Qualcomm MSM7201A ARM11 CPU. The Propel Pro is a slider phone with a full QWERTY keyboard that runs Windows Mobile 6.1 as its operating system. The phone only came in a chrome color. The joystick used for navigation was a new design compared to previous phones, which used D-pads. The display resolution was 320 x 320 and it has a 3.0 megapixel camera. The phone lacks a dedicated headphone jack, instead sporting a combination charging plug and headphone jack hole. The phone supports bluetooth, Wi-Fi, and has a built in microSD card slot.

== Reviews ==
The Propel Pro was met with average to positive reviews. CNET gave it a 7/10, Windows Central and Digital Trends gave it a 4/5, and TechCrunch spoke of it positively. Praise was given for its low price, features, and camera. Criticism was received for its bulk, proprietary headphone jack/charger combo, and its small display.
