= Gakken =

Japanese publishing company

Gakken Holdings Co., Ltd.

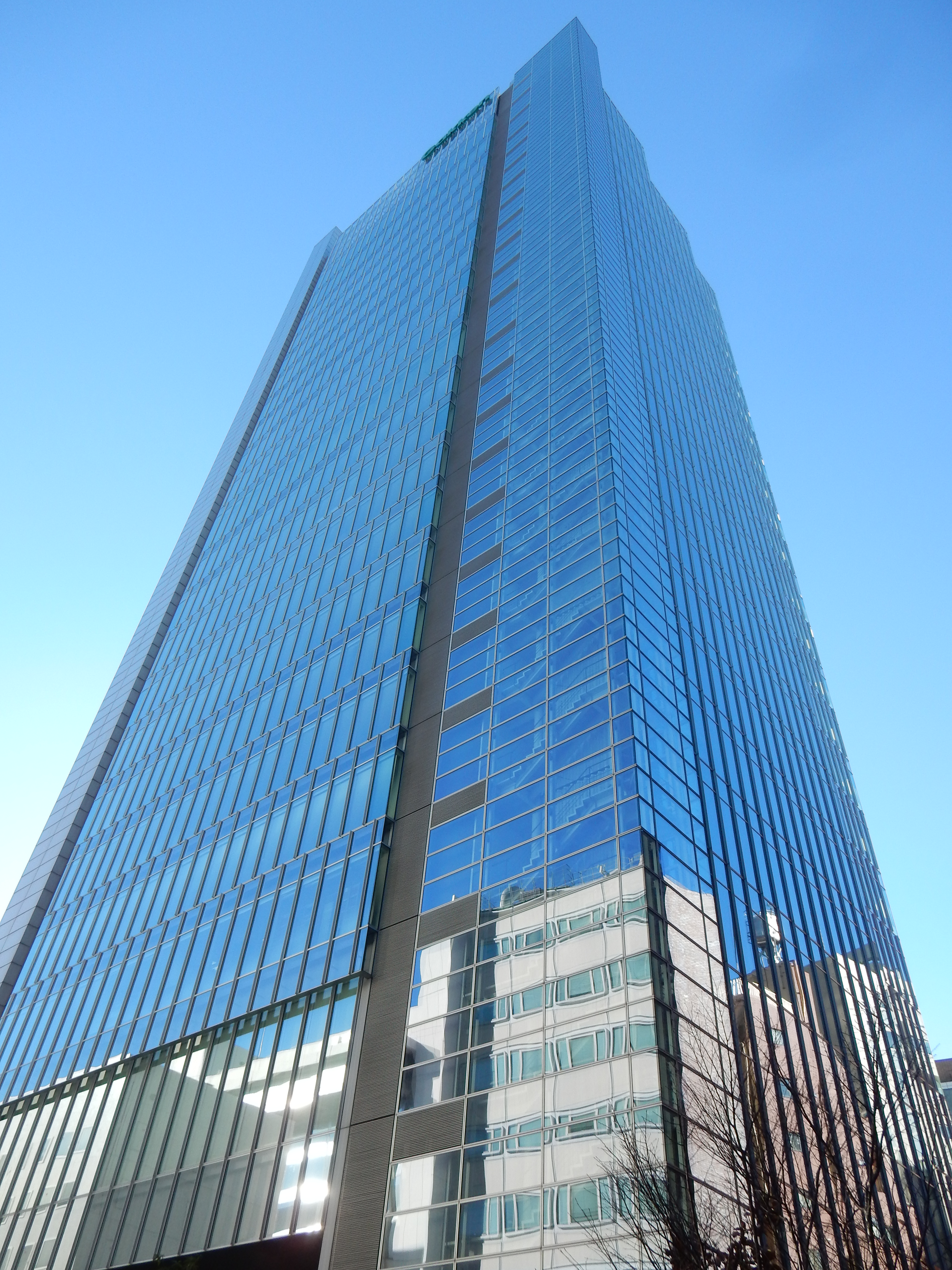
- Headquarters in Shinagawa, Tokyo
- Native name: 株式会社学研ホールディングス
- Romanized name: Kabushiki gaisha Gakken Hōrudingusu
- Formerly: Gakushū Kenkyūsha Co., Ltd. (1947–2009)
- Type: Public KK
- Traded as: TYO: 9470
- ISIN: JP3234200008
- Industry: Publishing
- Founded: March 31, 1947; 79 years ago
- Founder: Hideto Furuoka
- Headquarters: Nishigotanda, Shinagawa-ku, Tokyo, Japan
- Area served: Worldwide
- Key people: Hiroaki Miyahara (President)
- Products: Books; Magazines; Educational materials
- Services: Education services; Childcare services; Elderly care
- Revenue: ▲JPY 107 billion (FY 2018) (US$ 969 million) (FY 2018)
- Net income: ▼JPY 3 billion (FY 2018) (US$ 27 million) (FY 2018)
- Number of employees: 6,930 (consolidated, June 30, 2018)
- Website: Official website

Gakken Holdings Co., Ltd. (株式会社学研ホールディングス, Kabushiki-gaisha Gakken Hōrudingusu) is a Japanese publishing company founded in 1947 by Hideto Furuoka, which also produces educational toys. Their annual sales are reported at ¥ 90 billion ($789 million US).

Gakken publishes educational books and magazines and produces other education-related products. For nursery school age children and their caretakers, they produce items such as child care and nursing guides. For school children, they publish text books, encyclopedias, and science books. Gakken also publishes educational magazines for high school students, as well as school guides for all levels. Gakken also provides products for playrooms, study rooms, computer rooms and science rooms.

Gakken also publishes general family-oriented and gender-oriented magazines in sports, music, art, history, animation, cooking, and puzzles.

== History ==
Gakken is perhaps originally known for producing Denshi blocks and packaging them within electronic toy kits such as the Gakken EX-System, as far back as the 1970s. One of their original lines, the EX-150, was reissued in 2002, and was so popular as to inspire an expansion pack.

In 1981 Gakken released "Super Puck Monster", a tabletop LCD arcade game that resembled Pac-Man. Coleco also licensed "Super Puck Monster" and released it as an official Pac-Man game. Gakken also released an official Dig Dug game, unlike "Super Puck Monster" this game was only sold in Japan and never exported.

In 1983, the company released the Gekken FX-System, a microcomputer kit similar to the EX-System. The computer unit featured a 20-key keyboard, seven LED lamps and a single seven-segment display that was used to display hexadecimal values. This was placed in a framework that allowed Denshi blocks to be used to connect its inputs and outputs to other devices like buttons and speakers. The 4-bit computer was re-released in 2009, known as the GMC-4.

In October 1983, the Gakken Compact Vision TV Boy console was released.

Since 1993 Gakken has been publishing monthly logic puzzle magazines under the name Logic Paradise.

== Book series ==
- Buttercup Babies
- Fantasia Pictorial
- Gakken Workbooks (also referred to as: Gakkenbooks | Play Smart Workbooks)
- Koji series
- Megami Bunko
- Nora komikkusu (= Nora Comics), also known as Cain shirizu (= Cain comics) and as Nora Cain Comics
- Rekishi Gunzo Shirizu (歴史群像シリーズ) (= History Picture Collection Series), also known as: Gakken Rekishi Gunzo Series
- Rekishi Gunzo Taiheiyo Senshi Shirizu (歴史群像太平洋戦史シリーズ) (= Pacific Ocean Military History Picture Collection Series)
- Picture Story Series
