= Denshi =

Denshi may refer to:

- Denshi block (or electronic block) is a small plastic box containing an electronic component
- Denshi Sentai Denziman (Electronic Squadron Denziman), Toei's fourth entry to its Super Sentai series, broadcast 1980–1981
- Fukuda Denshi Arena, football stadium in Chiba, Japan
- Indigo Algorithm -Ai no Denshi Kisuuhou-, the seventh solo album by artist Daisuke Asakura
- Sanwa Electronic, one of the leading producers of Japanese radio-controlled model transmitters
