= S2000 =

S2000 may refer to:

- Honda S2000, a 1999–2009 Japanese roadster
- Peugeot 207 S2000, a rally Peugeot 207 concept car
- Super 2000, a racing car classification
- Mercedes-Benz S2000, a military truck and predecessor to the Mercedes-Benz Zetros
- Philco TRANSAC S-2000, a mainframe system intended for both business and scientific work
- American Microsystems S2000, a 4-bit microcontroller
