= American Microsystems =

Defunct semiconductor manufacturer

American Microsystems, Inc.
- Trade name: AMI
- Type: Public
- Industry: Semiconductors
- Founded: July 1966 in California, U.S.
- Founder: Employees of General Micro-electronics (GMe)
- Defunct: 2008
- Fate: Acquired by: Gould Electronics (1982); Japan Energy (1988); ON Semiconductor (2008)
- Successor: AMI Semiconductor (AMIS) in 2000
- Headquarters: Santa Clara
- Area served: United States, Asia, Europe
- Products: Microprocessors, -controllers & chipsets
- Parent: ON Semiconductor

American Microsystems, Inc., or AMI, was a semiconductor manufacturer formed in Santa Clara, California in 1966 by several former employees of General Micro-electronics. They were one of the first companies to focus on the metal oxide semiconductor (MOS) construction technique, which came to dominate the industry by the early 1970s.

Through the 1970s it concentrated on custom design work and production for a wide variety of customers, as well as selling its own microcontroller designs and calculator and electronic watch chipsets. As other companies entered the market for these products, they introduced simple microprocessors, including the S9209 which was the first to sell for under $10.

In the early 1970s, AMI held about 50% of the US MOS IC marketshare. Borg-Warner took an equity stake in 1977, but AMI was then purchased outright by Gould Electronics in 1982. Gould was in turn purchased by Japan Energy in 1988, who ran the AMI division under its GA-Tech division. AMI was purchased from GA-Tech by Francisco Partners in 2000, and they renamed it AMI Semiconductor, or AMIS, in January 2001. AMIS was in turn purchased by onsemi in March 2008, and no longer operates as a separate company.

== History ==
AMI formed in July 1966 by several former employees of General Micro-electronics (GMe). In 1966 GMe was purchased by Philco-Ford and many employees left to form their own companies like Electronic Arrays and AMI. AMI initially focused on custom logic design and manufacturing for other companies, including the US military.

In early 1969 they delivered an electronic calculator chipset for Smith Corona's Marchant division (SCM), which was used in the SCM Cogito 414 electronic calculator. From this start, AMI introduced a series of new calculator chipsets that came to dominate the industry. This success did not go unnoticed, and by late 1971 a number of larger companies, including Texas Instruments, General Instrument, Mostek and Electronic Arrays all introduced simpler and less expensive versions that quickly drove AMI out of the market leadership position.

After this time, AMI leveraged its calculator experience to introduce the calculator-like S2000 and S9209 designs intended for use in products like cash registers or gasoline pumps. The 9202 is historically notable as the first microprocessor that could be purchased for under $10 (in lots of 5,000). They also signed second source agreements with a number of companies to produce and sell their designs, including a major partnership with Motorola to produce the Motorola 6800 and the wide variety of support chips for that line.

AMI also used its calculator experience to work with companies on new custom designs. Among these were a variety of drivers for digital watches, ROM chips, and custom controllers for products like microwave ovens, digital tuners for television and FM radio, and systems for dashboards in cars. Through the mid-1970s, these systems were responsible for about half the company's work. They also invested heavily in dynamic RAM production, believing this would be a major source of income in the future.

As newer low-cost processors emerged in the second half of the 1970s, AMI withdrew from the processor market and concentrated on its custom design work and also used its production capability to become what would later be known as a semiconductor foundry. Among the products it produced for other companies was Atari's POKEY chip, produced in the millions.

By the 1990s, the company mainly focused on mixed-signal ASICs, mixed meaning a combination of digital and analog. Japan Energy subsidiary GA-TEK, owned the majority of the company by the late 1990s. In 2000, 80% of the company was purchased by The venture capital group Francisco Partners from Japan Energy subsidiary GA-TEK, and were renamed AMI Semiconductor, or AMIS, in January 2001. AMIS was in turn purchased by onsemi in 2008, and no longer operates as a separate company.
