= S1C6x =

The S1C6x series is a microcontroller families introduced by Epson. It is a 4-bit architecture. This Series includes S1C60 and S1C63 families. S1C60 is low end low power version. S1C63 is high end version. This family is used in many applications as it contains specialized peripherals such as LCD driver, dot-matrix driver, FSK demodulator, R/F converter ... etc.

== Technical description ==
The S1C6x series is a CISC Harvard architecture with 12-bit instructions with an 8.192 word instruction space. It uses a 4-bit word for either a binary format or as a BCD digit and has 16 memory mapped registers in register window together with two accumulators, two 12-bit pointers and a stack pointer for use in subroutines.

Most of the instructions operate on either two registers or a register and an immediate value, but the S1C6X series also has some memory-memory and memory-immediate instructions.
