= Essex SX 200 =

4-bit microprocessor first shipped in 1976

SX 200
General information
- Launched: 1976
- Common manufacturer: Essex International, Wire Assembly Division

Performance
- Max. CPU clock rate: 400 kHz
- Data width: 4-bit (RAM), 8-bit (ROM)
- Address width: 6-bit (RAM), 10-bit (ROM)

Physical specifications
- Package: 28-pin DIP

Architecture and classification
- Application: microcontroller
- Instructions: 41

The SX 200 is a specialized single-chip 4-bit microcontroller from Essex International (today part of Superior Essex), first announced in February 1976. Best known as a supplier of wire and cable, Essex garnered some press coverage for the SX 200 at the time, but the company was unable to market it successfully and withdrew it from public offering the following year; it remained in production for OEM applications well into the 1980s

The system combined the CPU, 1024 bytes of ROM and 64 nibbles of RAM in a 28-pin dual in-line package (DIP). There was no external memory, so the 4-bit data bus and address bus were internal. This left most of the external pins for input/output use. The customer provided the program that was burned into ROM, as well as the settings for a programmable logic array (PLA) that controlled the output pins.

== Design ==
The SX 200 is typical of a class of highly specialized microcontrollers that were intended to be used for industrial controllers and similar tasks. These were sometimes known as "display controllers" at the time, as they included logic specifically for use with a seven-segment display. Another example of the same class of processor is the American Microsystems S2000. EDN referred to these as "calculator like" due to their similarity to contemporary electronic calculator chipsets.

The SX 200 also included a dedicated 4-pin input port intended to be used with a capacitive sensing keypad with up to 16 keys. A second 8-pin port was divided into a 4-bit output and 4-bit input, or could be used as a single 7-bit output. Another 12-pin output port was normally used to drive a display.

There was no external memory, the entire system ran from a program supplied by the customer and burned into the 1,024 byte 8-bit ROM. Temporary storage was in the form of 64 4-bit SRAM locations.

The CPU has a 4-bit arithmetic logic unit (ALU) reading the 8-bit instructions from ROM and performing them using an accumulator and an index register pointing into the RAM. The results of these operations normally set bits in the 16-bit status register, which would then be interpreted by the customer-supplied PLA code to drive the output ports.

The system has 41 instructions, all of which completed in a 20 μsec cycle, which leads to a 50,000 instructions per second operational speed, more than enough for simple controller applications. There are three branch instructions, eight load-constant, two bit-manipulation, 20 register and eight I/O. The ALU could operate on binary-coded decimal data, which made it much easier to drive simple numeric displays.

Fabricated using a PMOS process, it required 10 to 18.5 V to operate, although drew relatively little current at around 25 mA. It was packaged in a 28-pin DIP; pins 1 to 8 were the input/output port, 18 though 27 the display output, 10 through 13 the keyboard input, 28 was V_{SS}, 14 was V_{DD}, and 15 was the clock output. A ground pin is not indicated in available resources. The clock was generated internally. This meant the system used 24 of its 28 pins for I/O.
