= Eneos =

Oil companies of Japan

ENEOS Corporation

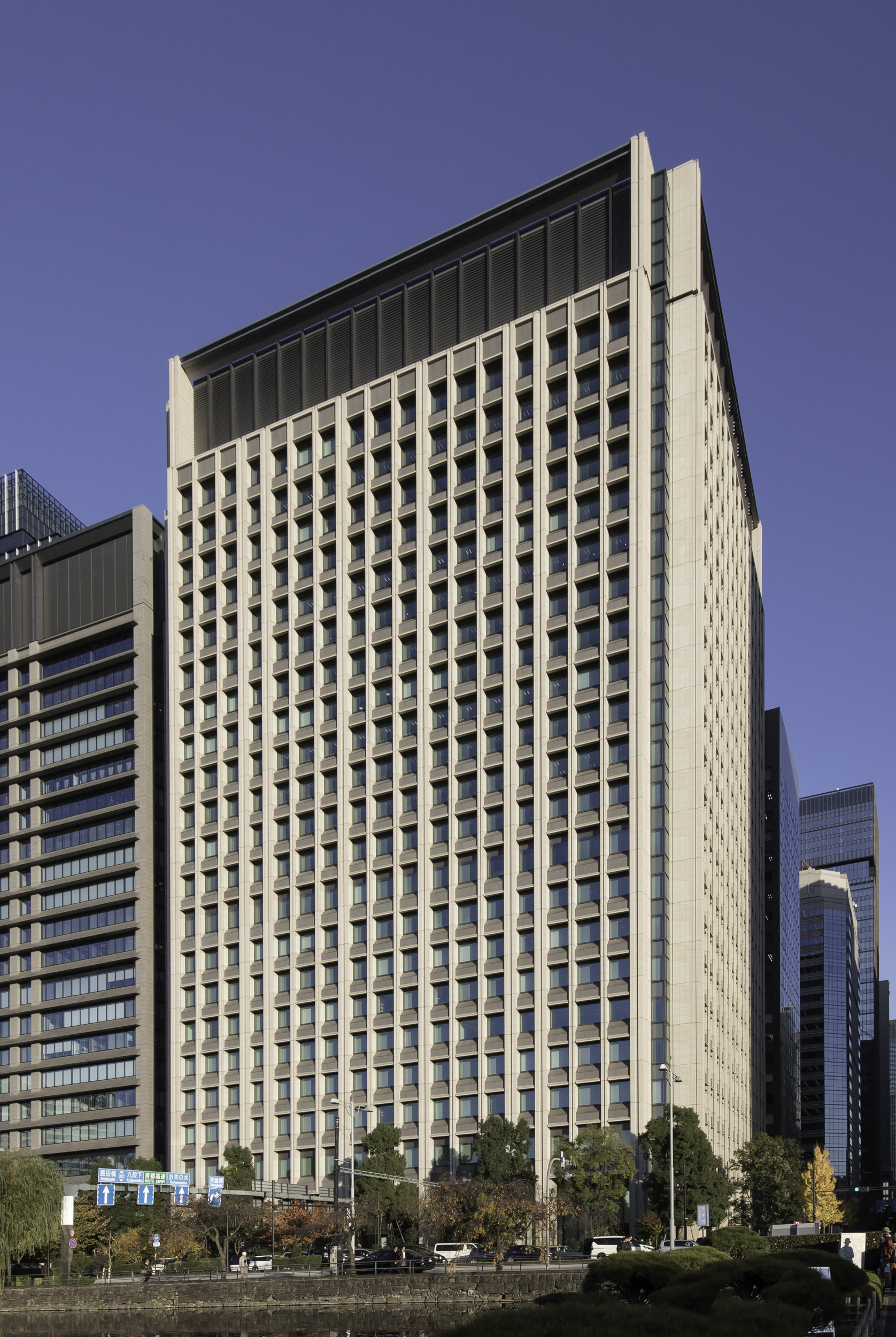
- Headquarters in Ōtemachi, Chiyoda, Tokyo
- Native name: ENEOS(エネオス)株式会社
- Romanized name: ENEOSU Kabushiki-gaisha
- Formerly: Nippon Oil Corporation (1888–1999; 2002–2010); Nippon Mitsubishi Oil Corporation (1999–2002); JX Nippon Oil & Energy Corporation (2010–2017); JXTG Nippon Oil & Energy Corporation (2017–2020)
- Type: Subsidiary
- Traded as: TYO: 5020
- Industry: Oil and gasoline
- Founded: May 10, 1888; 138 years ago
- Headquarters: Ōtemachi, Chiyoda, Tokyo, Japan
- Key people: Fumiaki Watari (CEO); Shinji Nishio (president)
- Products: Petroleum; Petrochemical; Fuel
- Revenue: ▲¥ 7,523.990 billion JPY (FY 2008)
- Net income: ▲¥ 148.306 billion JPY (FY 2008)
- Number of employees: 13,290 (2007)
- Parent: ENEOS Holdings
- Website: www.eneos.co.jp

ENEOS Corporation (Japanese: ENEOS(エネオス)株式会社, Hepburn: ENEOSU Kabushiki-gaisha), formerly JXTG Nippon Oil & Energy Corporation (Japanese: JXTGエネルギー株式会社, Hepburn: JXTG Enerugī Kabushiki-gaisha), or NOC or Shin-Nisseki (新日石) is a Japanese petroleum company. Its businesses include exploration, importation, and refining of crude oil; the manufacture and sale of petroleum products, including fuels and lubricants; and other energy-related activities. It is the largest oil company in Japan, and in recent years it has been expanding its operations in other countries.

Its products are sold under the ENEOS brand, which is also used for service stations. It also previously operated service stations under the Esso and Mobil brands under license from ExxonMobil. In 2019, as a result of JX Holdings' merger with TonenGeneral Group in 2017 to form JXTG Holdings, both brands were phased out in favour of ENEOS EneJet.

== History ==
The company was established 1888 as the "Nippon Oil" (日本石油, Nihon Sekiyu), or "Nisseki" (日石) for short. In 1999, the company merged with and absorbed the former "Mitsubishi Oil" (三菱石油, Mitsubishi Sekiyu). The merged company was called "Nippon Mitsubishi Oil" (日石三菱, Nisseki Mitsubishi) until 2002, when it was renamed back to Nippon Oil Corporation. In 2010, NOC merged with Nippon Mining to form JX Holdings, and Nippon Oil was renamed JX Nippon Oil & Energy. In 2017, JX and TonenGeneral were merged into JXTG Holdings. The company's name was slightly modified to JXTG Nippon Oil & Energy. In June 2020, ENEOS Corporation was adopted as the current name.

== Worldwide operations ==
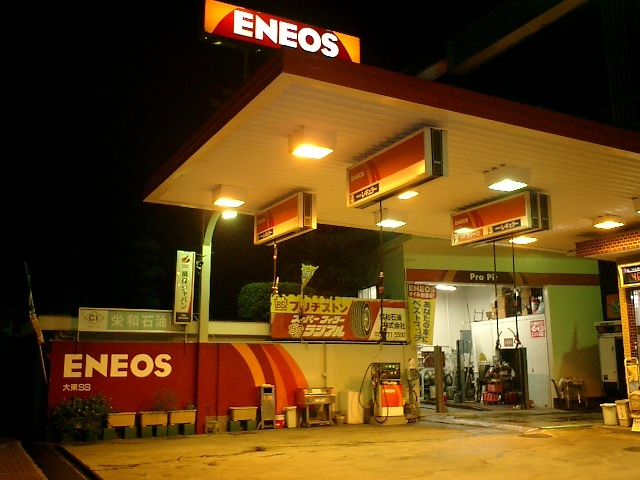
An ENEOS service station in Japan

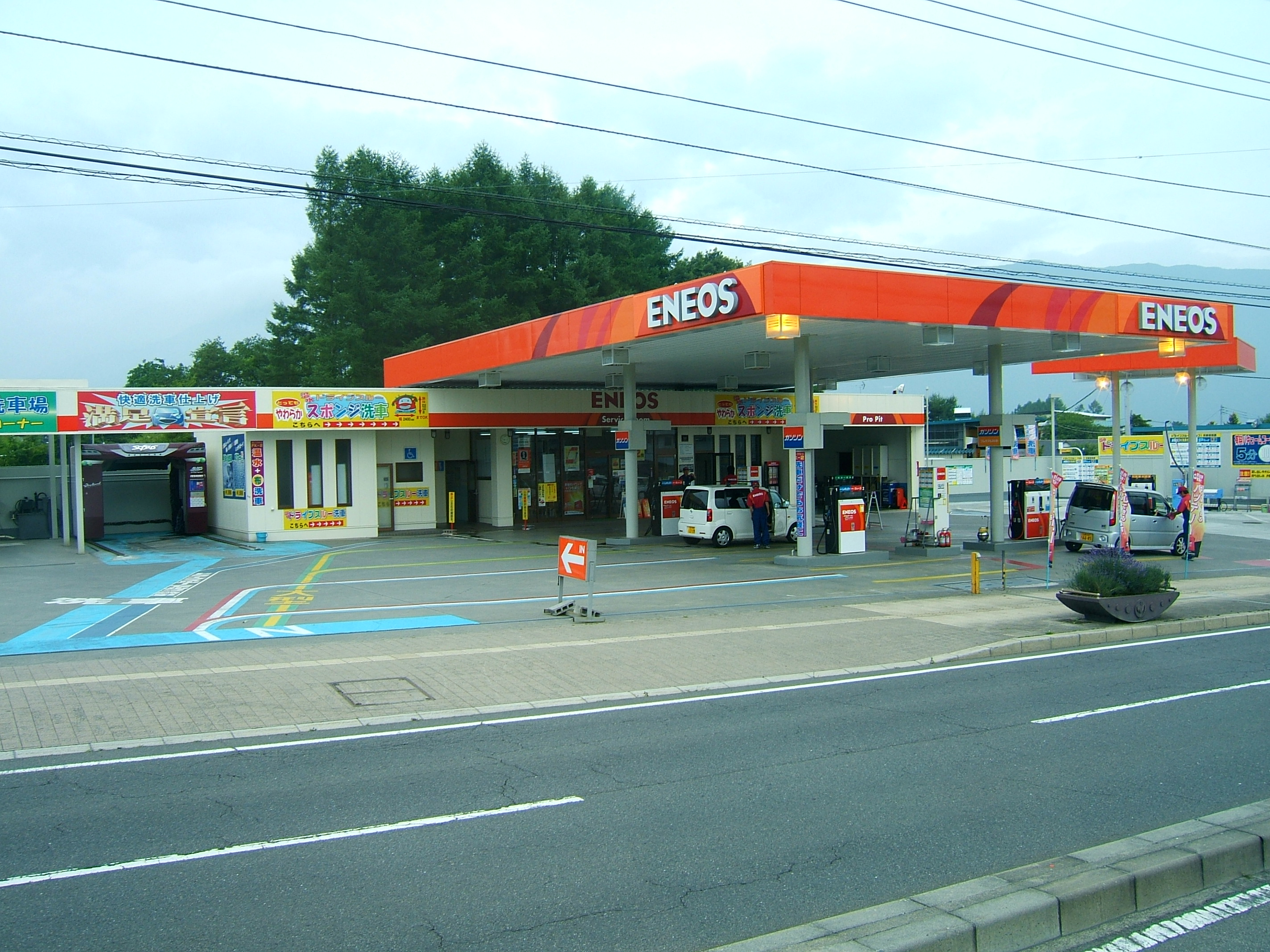
An ENEOS filling station near Mount Fuji in Japan

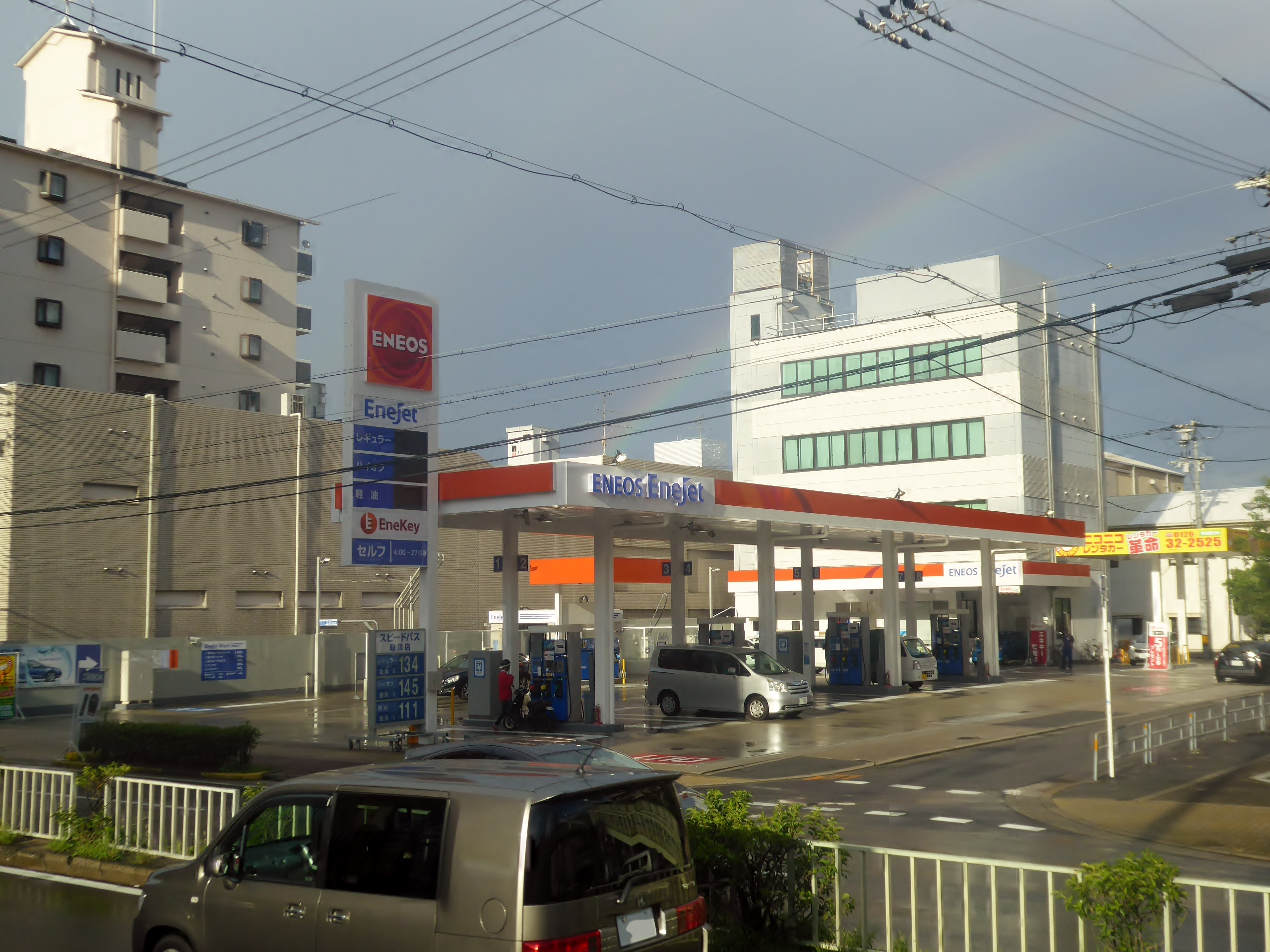
An Eneos EneJet petrol station.

The company has worldwide locations including ENEOS USA Inc. in Schaumburg, Illinois, Torrance, California, and Nippon Oil Lubricants (America), LLC, in Childersburg, Alabama.

ENEOS employs over 5,500 people, with additional employees from oversea divisions, and operates the following refineries throughout Japan:

- Oita Refinery
- Sendai Refinery
- Kashima Refinery
- Negishi Refinery
- Mizushima Refinery
- Kawasaki Refinery
- Marifu Refinery
- Chiba Refinery
- Sakai Refinery

Nippon Oil Exploration owns a 5% share of Syncrude, a Canadian oil sands mining company, through its fully owned subsidiary Mocal Energy.

The company also has technical collaboration with Tide Water Oil Co., an Indian petroleum products manufacturer. Superior quality lubricants under the brand name ENEOS are manufactured and marketed in India by Tide Water Oil Co.

=== 2011 earthquake and tsunami ===
On 11 March 2011, a 145,000-barrel-per-day refinery in Sendai was set ablaze by the Tōhoku earthquake. Workers were evacuated, but tsunami warnings hindered efforts to extinguish the fire until 14 March, when officials planned to do so.

== Environmental record ==
While developing the Rang Don Oil Field and Helang Gas Field NOEX, part of the Nippon Oil Corporation, conducted environmental impact assessments. These assessments helped them implement management plans based on the results of the assessments, specifically, how to reduce the impact of the fields on surrounding sea areas.

In 2005, Nippon Oil and Ebara-Ballard announced they were going to start field testing a 1 kW household proton-exchange membrane fuel cell system that uses coal oil as fuel. It was the world's first household test with the system. The system achieves a greater power-generation efficiency than normal heating. The system can operate in temperatures as low as -10 deg C.

In 2007, Nippon Oil was the recipient of the Nippon Keidanren Chairman's Prize in recognition of its achievements in a number of areas. They were the first in the Japanese petroleum industry to achieve a zero emission status at their refineries. They are also developing fuel cell systems as well as producing and selling sulfur-free fuel. The Rang Dong Oil Field is also one of the biggest CO_{2} reduction projects in the world. The project utilizes associated gas produced along with crude oil for additional energy production.

== Sponsorship ==
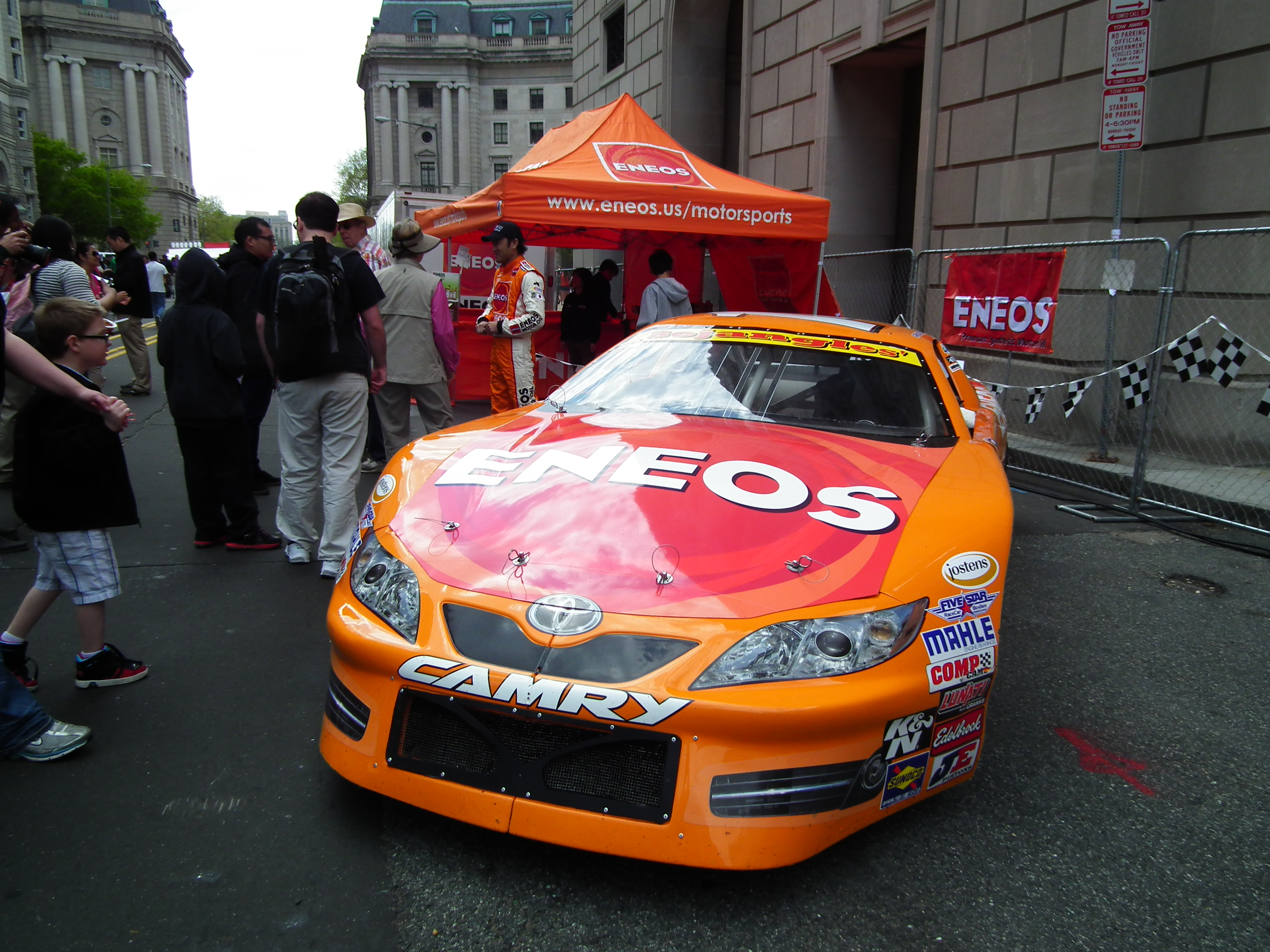
2013 Sakura Matsuri Festival (Washington, D.C.)

Nippon Oil is a current sponsor of one of the most successful clubs in world football AC Milan from Italy and also sponsors the F.C. Tokyo football club.

It has also sponsored several motor sports teams, such as Team Lexus LeMans ENEOS SC430 in the Japanese Super GT series in the GT500 class. In the late 1980s and early 1990s JSPC, it sponsored the Trust Racing Team Porsche. From 2005 to 2008, ENEOS sponsored the Formula One program of Honda, with British American Racing in 2005, Honda Racing F1 from 2006 to 2008, and Super Aguri from 2006 to 2007. Since 2014, the Eneos brand has been featured on Kyle Larson's #42 Chevrolet Camaro in the NASCAR Xfinity Series in select races. They also sponsor Akinori Ogata in the NASCAR Camping World Truck Series when he drives the 63 for MB Motorsports. He drove the 63 truck in 2015 and 2016. ENEOS is currently a sponsor of Monster Energy Yamaha MotoGP team as a fuel and lubricants supplier since 2012 season and also supplying fuel and lubricants for Pata Yamaha with Brixx WorldSBK World Superbike team since 2016 season.

The company also currently sponsors the 1000km of Palanga endurance race in Lithuania.
