= GMC-4 =

Japanese microcomputer

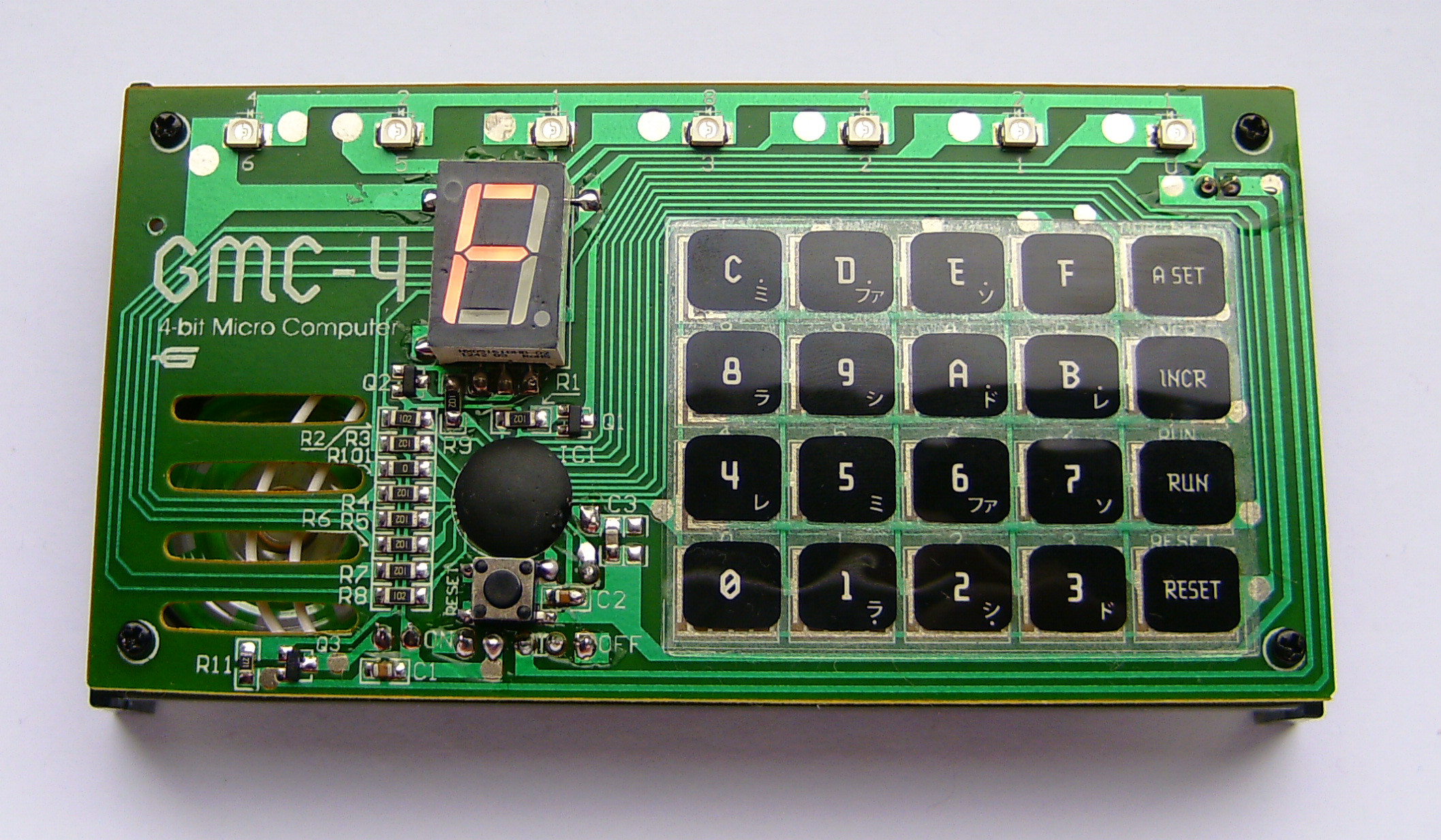
GMC-4

The GMC-4 is the only 4-bit microcomputer to be mass-produced in the last 30 years (as of 2009). It was produced by Gakken, a Japanese publisher who distributed it with a magazine attached to a box containing the components required to assemble the computer. It is based on the Texas Instruments TMS1100 microcontroller.

The GMC-4 is a modernized version of Gakken's 1983 Gakken FX-System, also known as the R-165. This system was also sold by Radio Shack as the Science Fair Microcomputer Trainer, but replaced the FX's circuit board with hand-wired circuity assembled by the user using springs to hold short bits of wire.

The purpose of the GMC-4 is education. It provides an accessible way to learn about assembly language and the principles of computing.
