= JX Advanced Metals =

Japanese non-ferrous metal company

JX Advanced Metals Corporation

- Native name: JX金属
- Romanized name: JX Kinzoku
- Formerly: Nippon Mining Holdings, Inc.
- Company type: Subsidiary
- Traded as: TYO: 5016
- Industry: Mining
- Founded: 27 September 2002
- Owner: Eneos Holdings (42.4%)
- Website: https://www.jx-nmm.com/english/

JX Advanced Metals Corporation (JX金属, JX Kinzoku) is a Japanese non-ferrous metal company partially owned by ENEOS Holdings. Its activities include resource development, smelting, refining, and recycling. The firm holds a global market share of approximately 60% in sputtering targets, a key material used in semiconductor manufacturing.

The origins of JX Advanced Metals trace back to the 1905 opening of the Hitachi Mine by Fusanosuke Kuhara. In 1929, Nissan Group's mining division split off to form Japan Mining Co., which later evolved through industry reorganisations to become part of Nippon Mining Holdings (Nippon Mining Holdings, Inc.). In 2010, Nippon Mining Holdings and Nippon Oil merged to create JX Holdings, now known as ENEOS Holdings, bringing what would become JX Advanced Metals under its umbrella.

The company is scheduled to go public with an expected market capitalisation of over 800 billion yen in March 2025. The company previously owned the Caserones Mine in Chile as a primary source of copper. Still, it sold 70% of its interest in it to Lundin Mining to focus more on semiconductor-related products. The company owns interests in other copper mines in Chile as well.

== Products and services ==
- Electronic materials and chemical processing
- Copper foils
- Sputtering targets
- Compound semiconductors
- High-purity metals (silicon, iron, nickel, copper, etc.)
- Surface treatment agents
- Copper powder
- Copper sulphate
- Copper alloy rolled products
- Precision-stamped products
- Precision-plated products

== See also ==
Other Japanese non-ferrous metals companies

- Sumitomo Metal Mining
- Toho Zinc
- Dowa Holdings
- Nittetsu Mining
- FURUKAWA
- Mitsui Mining and Smelting
- Mitsubishi Materials

Key figures

- Yoshisuke Ayukawa
- Fusanosuke Kuhara
