= ENEOS Holdings =

Japanese petroleum company

ENEOS Holdings, Inc.

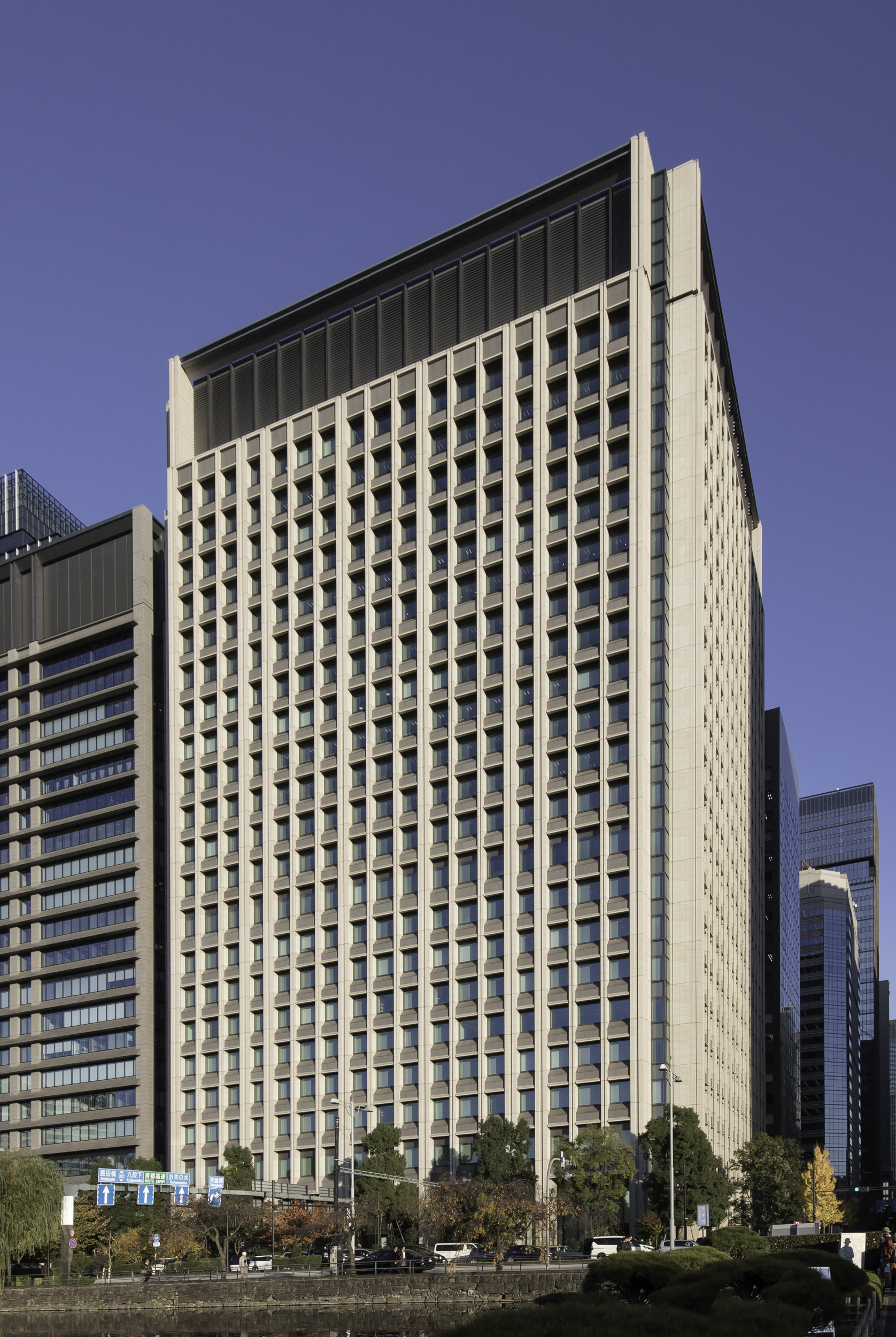
- ENEOS Holdings headquarters in Tokyo, Japan
- Native name: ENEOS(エネオス)ホールディングス株式会社
- Romanized name: ENEOSU Hōrudingusu kabushiki gaisha
- Formerly: JX Holdings, Inc. (2010–2017); JXTG Holdings, Inc. (2017–2020)
- Type: Public (Kabushiki gaisha)
- Traded as: TYO: 5020; NAG: 5020; Nikkei 225 component (TYO); TOPIX Large70 component (TYO)
- Industry: Oil and gas Mining and metals
- Predecessors: List: Nippon Oil Co., Ltd. (Nisseki, a Caltex affiliate until the 1990s); Mitsubishi Oil Co., Ltd.; Kyushu Oil Co., Ltd.; Nippon Mitsubishi Oil Corporation (Nisseki Mitsubishi), later Nippon Oil Corporation (Shin-Nisseki); Nippon Mining Co., Ltd.; Kyodo Oil Co., Ltd. (Kyoseki); Japan Energy Corporation; Nippon Mining Holdings, Inc.; Toa Nenryo Kogyo KK, later Tonen KK; Tonen Sekiyu Kagaku KK; General Bussan KK, later General Sekiyu KK (a Mitsui & Co. spinoff); Mitsui Oil Supply Co., Ltd., later Mitsui Oil Co., Ltd. (1961 Mitsui & Co. subsidiary); Esso Standard Sekiyu KK, later Esso Sekiyu KK; Mobil Sekiyu KK; EMG Marketing GK (ExxonMobil); TonenGeneral Sekiyu
- Founded: April 1, 2010; 16 years ago
- Headquarters: Ōtemachi, Chiyoda, Tokyo, Japan
- Area served: Worldwide
- Key people: Katsuyuki Ota (Chairman); Tomohide Miyata (CEO & Executive VP)
- Products: Fuels; Lubricants; Petrochemicals; Metals
- Revenue: ▲JPY 11 trillion (2013)
- Operating income: ▼JPY 251 billion (2013)
- Net income: ▼JPY 159 billion (2013)
- Total assets: ▲JPY 7.27 trillion (2013)
- Total equity: ▲JPY 2 trillion(2013)
- Number of employees: 24,691 (2012)
- Subsidiaries: ENEOS Corporation; JX Advanced Metals; JX Nippon Oil & Gas Exploration
- Website: www.hd.eneos.co.jp

ENEOS Holdings, Inc. (ENEOS(エネオス)ホールディングス株式会社) is a Japanese global petroleum and metals conglomerate headquartered in Tokyo, Japan. In 2012 the multinational corporation consisted of 24,691 employees worldwide and, as of March 2013, JX Holdings was the forty-third largest company in the world by revenue. It is one of the core companies of the Mitsubishi Group through its predecessor (the original Nippon Oil Company)'s merger with Mitsubishi Oil.

== Establishment ==
ENEOS Holdings was established on April 1, 2010, as JXTG Holdings through the joint share transfer by Nippon Oil Corporation and Nippon Mining Holdings, Inc. On July 1, 2010, all the businesses of both Group Companies were integrated and reorganized under JX Holdings, resulting in the incorporation of three core business companies:

- ENEOS Corporation – petroleum refining and marketing
- JX Nippon Oil & Gas Exploration – oil and natural gas exploration and production
- JX Nippon Mining & Metals – mining and metal

Final logo of TonenGeneral Sekiyu. Prior to its merger with JX, ExxonMobil had a 22% stake.

In April 2017, JX Holdings and TonenGeneral Sekiyu K.K. merged to form JXTG Holdings. JXTG Holdings was renamed in June 2020 to ENEOS Holdings.

== Controversy ==
In August 2022, ENEOS CEO Tsutomu Sugimori resigned for what was described at the time as personal reasons. The following month, however, the company confirmed that the reason for Sugimori's departure was due to allegations that he sexually harassed and injured a woman working at a hostess bar in Okinawa, which were later substantiated. The company's statement followed a report about the incident in a weekly magazine.

In December 2023, Takeshi Saito was dismissed as the president of ENEOS after an independent investigation validated claims that he inappropriately hugged a woman at a social gathering while intoxicated.
