= Gakken EX-System =

Japanese educational electronics kits

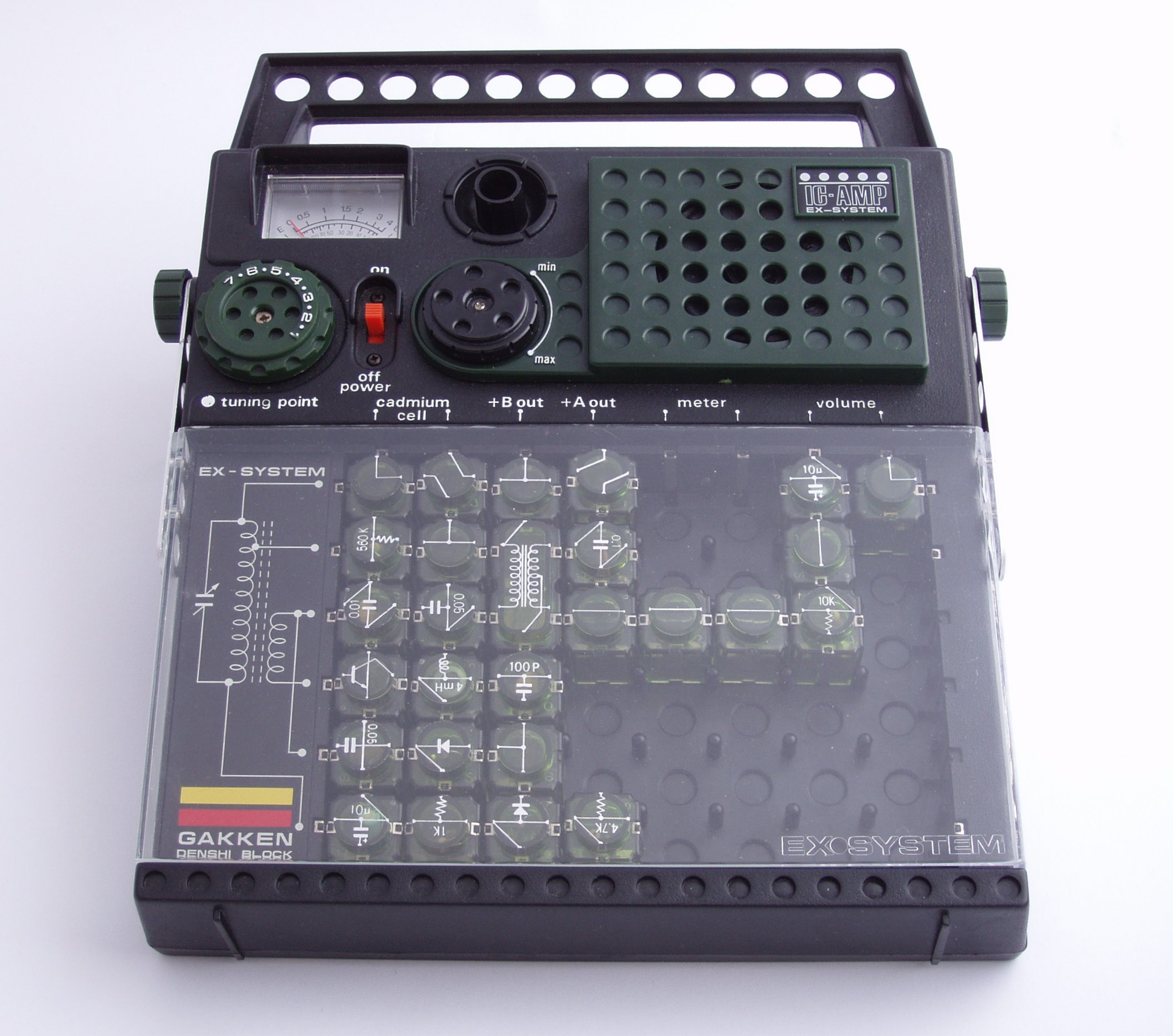
The Gakken EX-150 set up for experiment #108.

The Gakken EX-System is a series of educational electronics kits produced by Gakken in the late 1970s. The kits use denshi blocks (also known as electronic blocks) to allow electronics experiments to be performed easily and safely. Over 25 years after its original release, one of the main kits from the series was reissued in Japan in 2002.

== History ==
A brief timeline:

1972
Gakken and Denshi Block Mfg. Co. Ltd. collaborate to release denshi block kits under Gakken's name.
1976
The EX series was released.
1981
The successor to the EX series, the FX series, is released.
1986
Gakken stops producing denshi block kits.
2002
The EX-150 is reissued in Japan, and is successful enough to justify the production of an expansion kit.
2011
Gakken releases a small kit compatible with the EX-system, #32 in their "Otona no Kagaku" mook series.

== EX-System kits ==
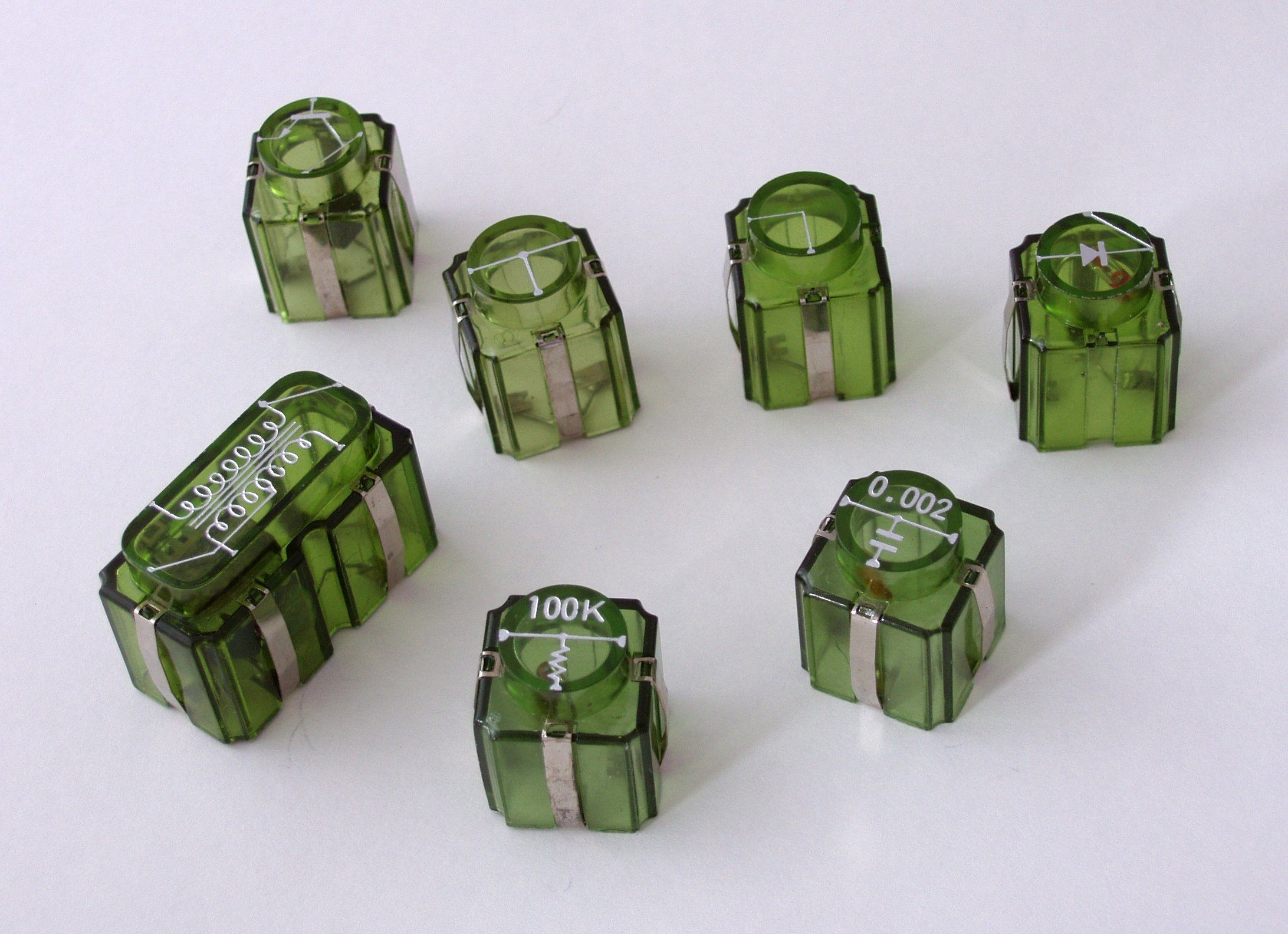
Several denshi blocks from the Gakken EX-150.

An EX-System kit consists of:

- a selection of denshi blocks,
- the main unit in which circuits are built,
- some additional external apparatus, and
- an instruction booklet.

=== Denshi blocks ===
A denshi block (or electronic block) is a small plastic box containing an electronic component. Each block has conductive metal strips on its sides, and when two blocks are placed side-by-side, their metal strips touch allowing electricity to flow between them. The top of each block is labelled with a schematic representation of the component it contains.

A circuit is built by placing a configuration of denshi blocks in a two dimensional grid. Because of the two dimensional layout and the labels on the blocks, a configuration of blocks resembles a schematic of the circuit.

While most denshi blocks are of a standard size, there are some larger blocks for containing complex components. In particular, the synthesiser block and the FM tuner block are much larger, occupying an area 4x5 standard blocks and 3x6 standard blocks, respectively.

=== The main unit ===
The main unit holds the grid of blocks (it has room for 6×8 standard blocks), batteries and some additional circuitry. When fully expanded, the main unit contains:

- an antenna circuit, with tuning knob
- an amplifier, with volume control
- a light sensitive resistor (CdS cell / Cadmium cell)
- an analogue meter

=== External apparatus ===
Some circuits require apparatus which are unsuitable for putting inside blocks, for example, a crystal earpiece. These have wires which terminate in flat metal contacts, and they are connected to the circuit by sliding the contacts between the metal strips of two neighbouring blocks.

Some experiments also involve non-electrical apparatus, for example, the optical fibres from the optical experiments kit. The optical fibres are connected via a special block.

=== Instruction booklet ===
The instruction booklet gives the correct arrangement of blocks to make each circuit, a full schematic for it and a brief explanation of how the experiment works.

== The original EX-System kits ==
The names of the original kits, EX-15, EX-30, etc., give the number of experiments that could be performed with them. By purchasing expansion kits, EX-A, EX-B, etc., any of the kits could be upgraded to support the complete set of 191 experiments. Each expansion kit added new denshi blocks and came with a piece of external apparatus or some circuitry to be installed in the main unit.

Note that the EX-FM kit is compatible with all of the main kits, although some of its experiments require blocks from later kits in the series.

Name	As upgrade	Significant components	Example experiment
EX-15		antenna, crystal earpiece	Diode Detector Radio
EX-30	EX-15 + EX-A	morse key block, short cables	Morse Code Practice Circuit
EX-60	EX-30 + EX-B	IC Amplifier	I-Diode Detector + IC Radio (Fixed Bias)
EX-100	EX-60 + EX-C	tester probes	Wireless Water Level Warning Device
EX-120	EX 100 + EX-D	microphone, CdS cell	Circuit which Buzzes when Struck by Light
EX-150	EX-120 + EX-E	analogue meter	Noise Level Meter
EX-181	EX-150 + EX-System Synthesizer	synthesizer block, resistance board	Sound of Car being Reversed
EX-FM	any main kit + EX-FM	FM tuner block	FM Receiver with Microphone Mixer

== The reissue kits ==
The reissued EX-150 kit from 2002 is almost identical to the original EX-150 from the 1970s. Due to differences in the availability of certain components, there are changes in some of the circuitry. A consequence is that some of the experiments have been altered.

=== Optical expansion kit ===
The reissued EX-150 sold well enough to justify an expansion kit. It is designed for the reissued EX-150 only and, allegedly, will not work with the original. The expansion contains components for performing optical experiments, including LED blocks, optical fibres and a 555 timer IC block. As some of the experiments involve two separate circuits, a plastic tray with room for 6 x 5 standard blocks is also provided.

An example experiment:

- The kit includes a disk with bands of black and white regions printed on it. The user builds a circuit in the tray which spins the disk. In the main unit, the user builds a circuit which can "read" the regions via the optic fibre and produce a sound. By moving the end of the optical fibre across the spinning disk, the user can play notes of the musical scale.

== Trivia ==
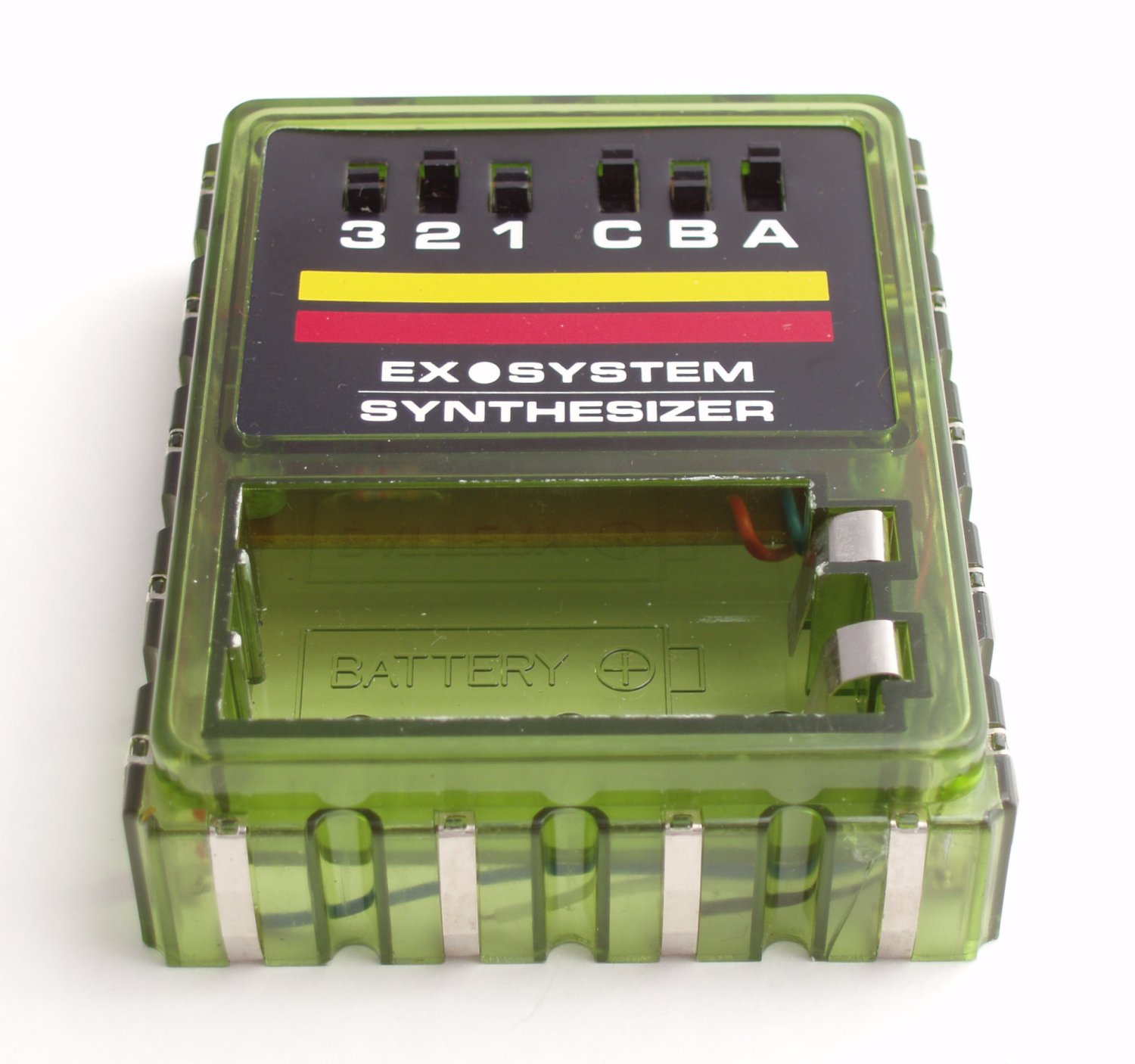
The EX-System Synthesizer Block.

The sound synthesizer was based around the Texas Instruments SN76477 sound chip. Since the chip requires a separate 9V power supply, the synthesizer block had a compartment for holding a 9V battery.

Although the EX-FM tuner block supported 10 new experiments in Japan, in the English language version available in Europe, only 4 experiments are described.

A Japanese man, Hiroyuki Inoue, built an IPv6 communication module as a block for the EX-150.

The Denshi Block system was also sold under the Humbrol, Skilcraft and Tron Link brands.

== FX-System ==
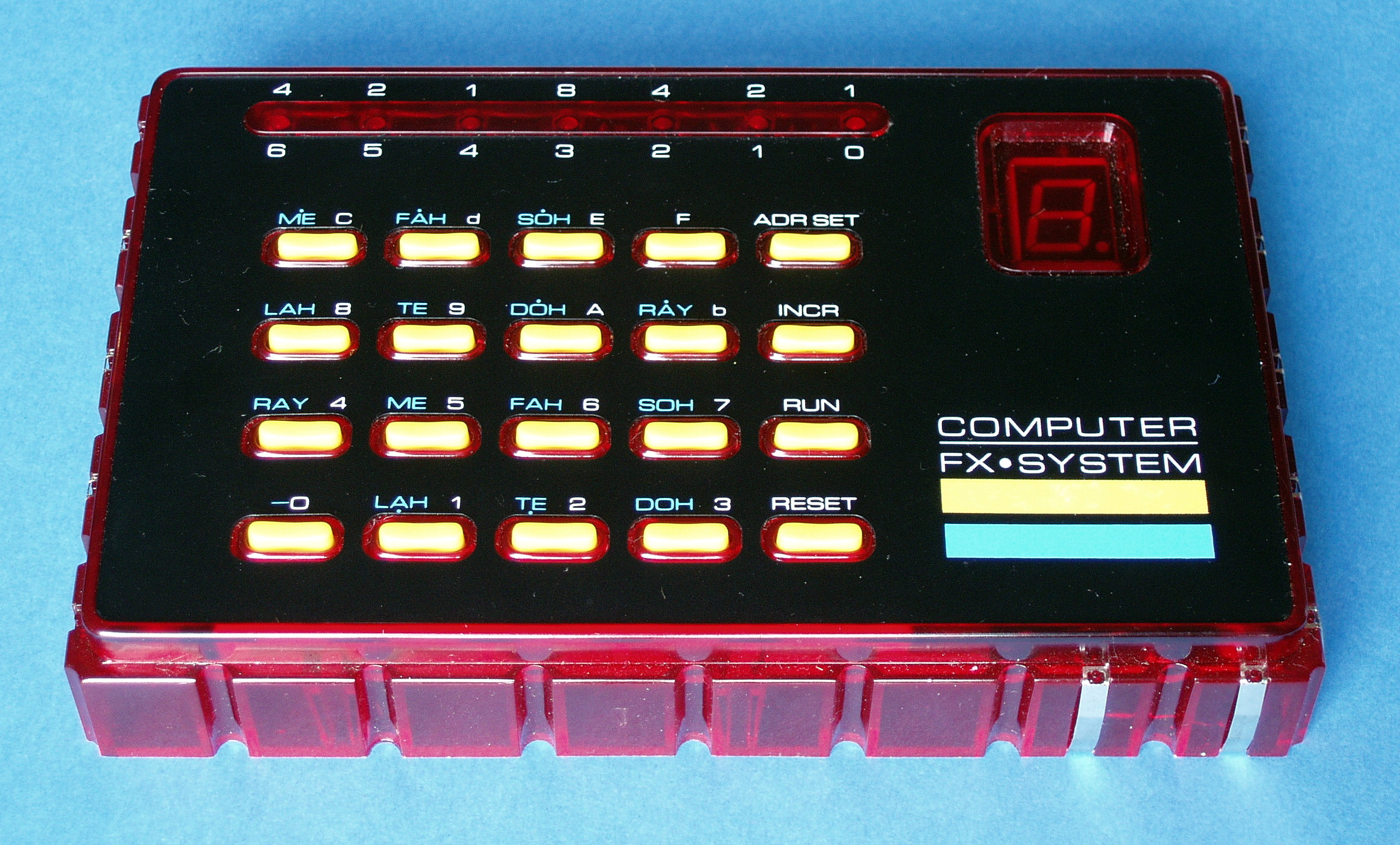
Gakken Computer FX System

The FX-System was introduced in 1981. It used the TMS1000 processor.
