= EM Microelectronic =

Swiss semiconductor manufacturer

- Industry: Semiconductors
- Founded: 1975
- Headquarters: Marin, La Tène, Switzerland
- Key people: Michel Willemin (CEO)
- Products: integrated circuits, RFID, Bluetooth Low Energy, Real-time clocks, Optical sensors
- Website: www.emmicroelectronic.com

EM Microelectronic, based in Marin, La Tène near Neuchâtel in Switzerland, is a developer and semiconductor manufacturer specialized in the design and production of ultra low power, low voltage integrated circuits for battery-operated and field-powered applications in consumer, automotive and industrial areas. It is a subsidiary of The Swatch Group.

== History ==
EM began as a division of Ebauches Electroniques SA and was founded in 1975. In August 2022, they partnered up with Exeger, a manufacturer of solar cells.

== Subsidiaries ==
EM Microelectronic has a design center at its headquarters in Marin, in the French speaking part of Switzerland near the city of Neuchâtel.

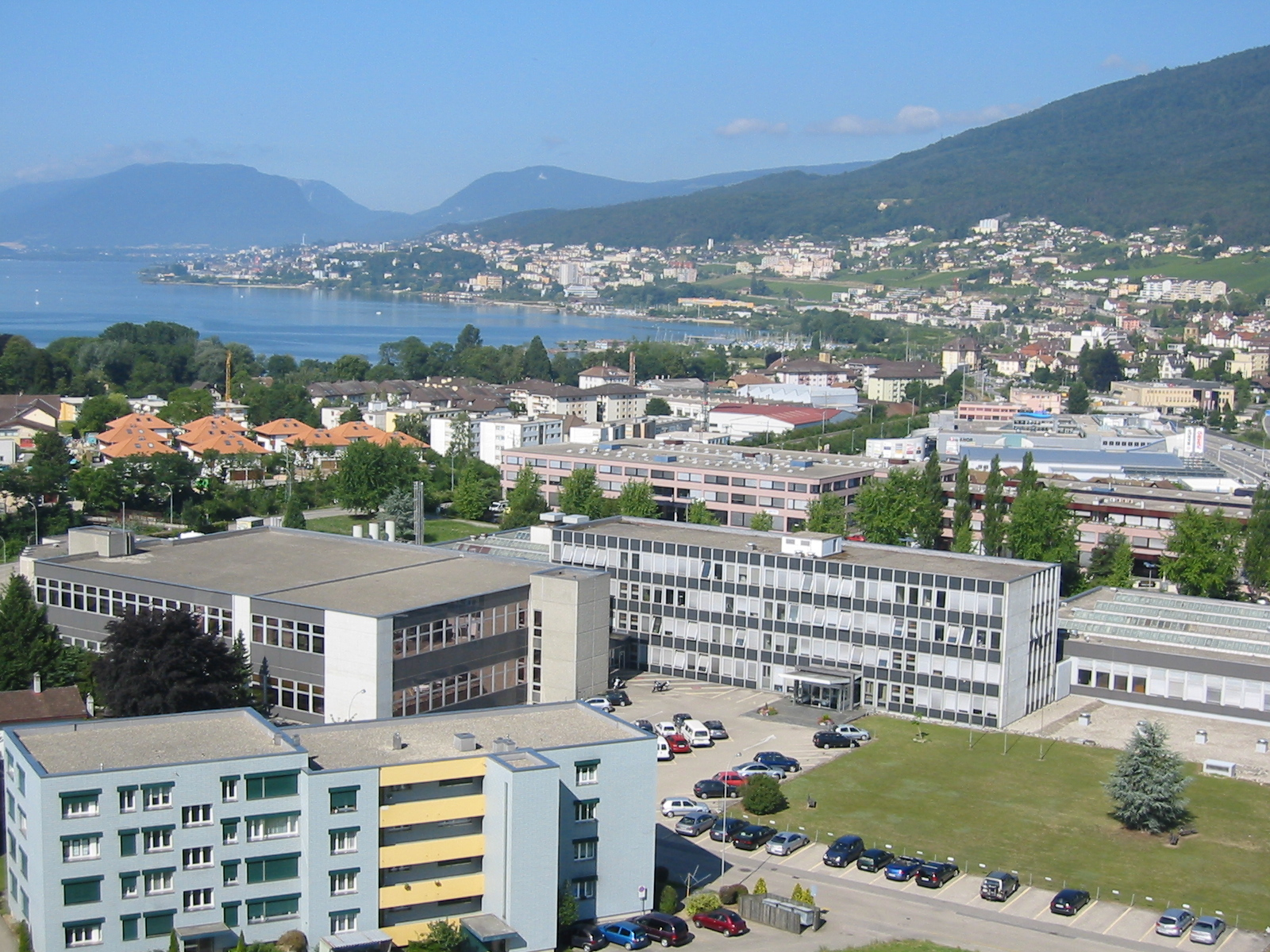
EM Microelectronic Headquarter in Marin

EM has subsidiaries and additional design centers:

- EM Microelectronic - US Inc., located in Colorado Springs, Colorado, U.S., is a subsidiary of EM Microelectronic.

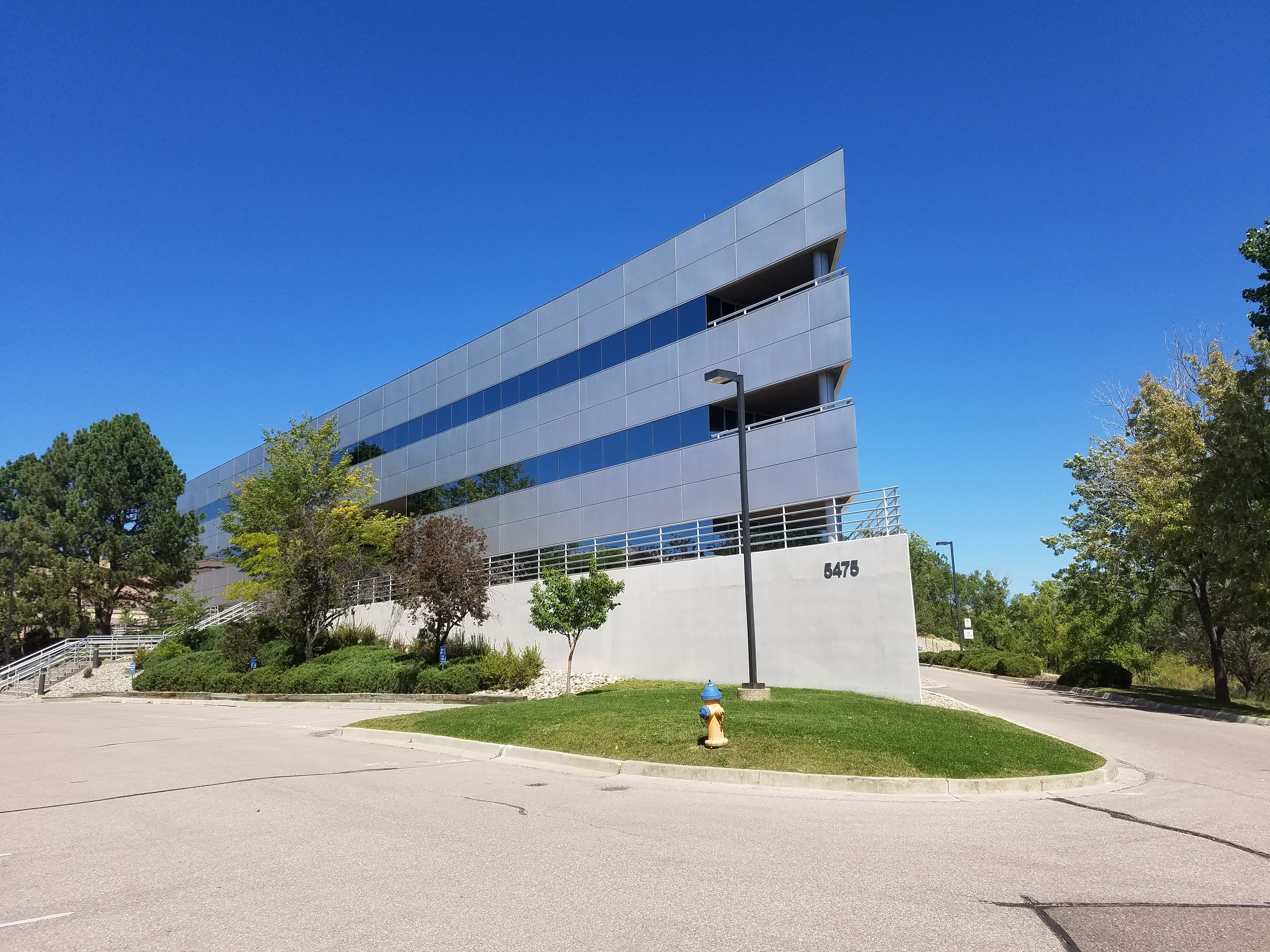
EM Microelectronic US, Colorado Springs CO

- ASICentrum s.r.o. is a design center located in Prague, Czech Republic. It is involved in the design of digital, analog and mixed-signal ICs.

== Technology ==
EM Microelectronic specialises in the design and production of ultra low power, low voltage integrated circuits for battery-operated and field-powered applications in consumer, automotive and industrial products. It has in-house semiconductor fabrication facilities and also uses external foundries.

== Products ==
EM Microelectronic's products include RFID circuits, smart cards ICs, ultra-low power microcontrollers, energy harvesting, power management, LCD drivers and displays, optical sensors and sensor interface ICs. EM manufactures not only standard circuits and ASICs, but also systems and modules for applications such as access control, radio frequency identification, mobile phones, mass-market consumer appliances, alarm and security systems, utility and heating meters, sensor signal processing, controlling, car immobilization, electronic automotive subsystems and many more.

Their microcontrollers use CoolRISC instruction set, instructions are 22 bits wide and operate on 8-bit data.

== BLE and 2.4 GHz wireless ==
EM Microelectronic designs and develops Bluetooth Low Energy products such as the EM9304, aimed at smallest footprint and lowest power consumption applications. When the 32 bit EM9304 launched in 2016 it was the smallest Bluetooth 4.2 SoC available. EM is an associate member of the Bluetooth SIG and is contributing through several working group to improve global specification and expertise in ultra-low power design for Bluetooth low energy wireless technology. EM Micro has also a proprietary link family of products with 1Mbits, 2 Mbit/s and Long range solutions.

== RFID ==
EM started its RFID activity in the 1980s, and its portfolio includes passive, semi-active and active RFID products, in frequency ranges including LF, HF and UHF.

The popularity of EM Microelectronic's range of ~125 kHz RFID devices has led to product from other manufacturers being advertised as "EM4100 compatible" although this may simply mean that the active device embedded in the RFID tag/card is an EM Microelectronic product.

EM Microelectronic developed UHF RFID ICs in the early 1990s and launched the first mass retail deployment in 2003, with Marks & Spencer.

By 2008, EM had shipped 250 million UHF ICs to into the Marks & Spencer project.

In 2015, EM Microelectronic released em|echo, a range of chips combining UHF and HF RFID communication, or RAIN RFID and NFC, a combination it calls “RAINFC”. This concept allows using the same RFID tag for the logistics and the consumer interaction with a product. In 2020, EM launched the second generation of this family, em|echo-V, awarded “Best New Product” by RFID Journal

== See also ==
- Application-specific integrated circuit
- Bluetooth low energy
- Microcontroller
- RFID
