= Denshi block =

Box containing an electrical component

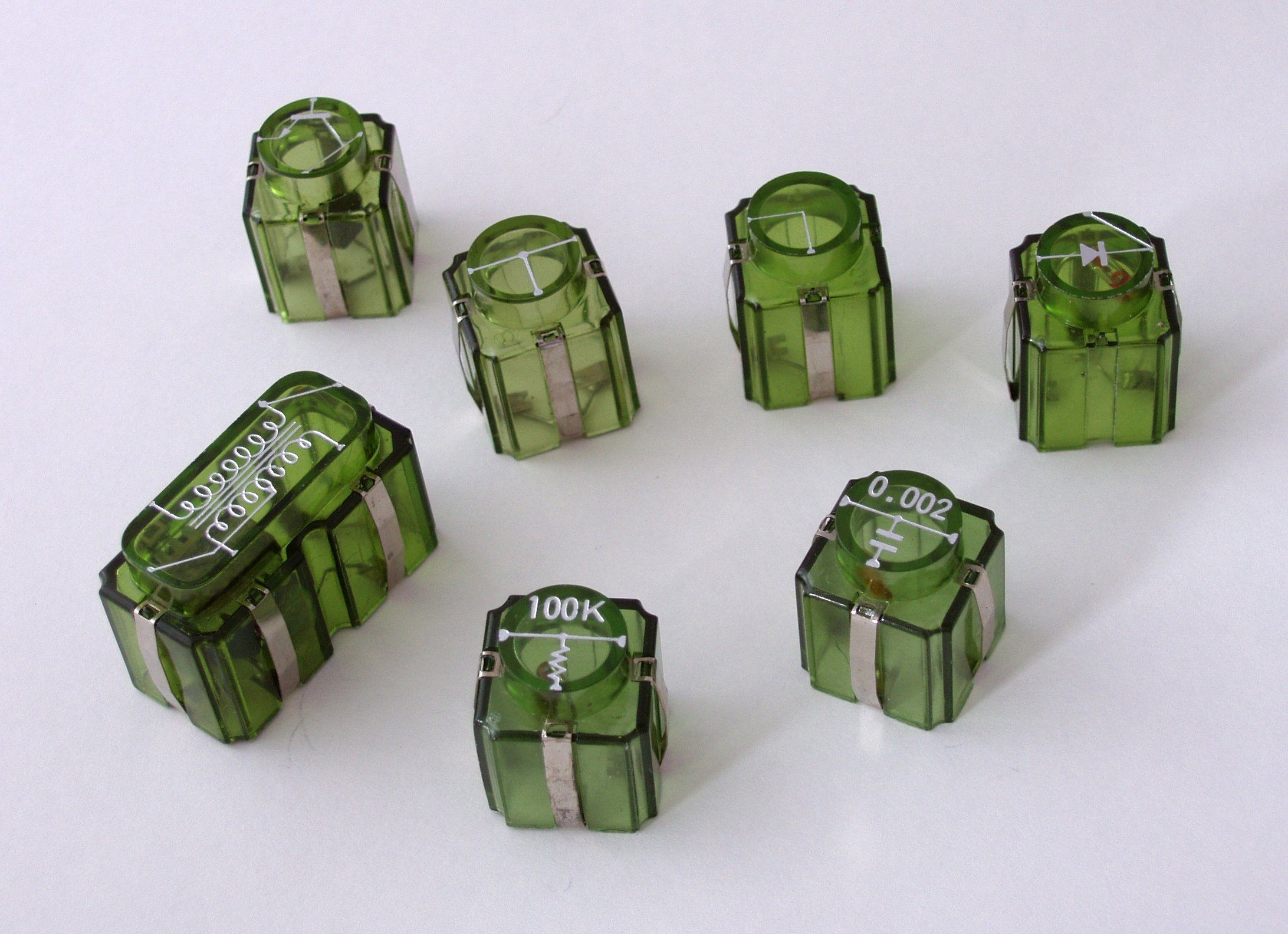
Several denshi blocks from the Gakken EX-150

A denshi block (or electronic block; the name "denshi" 電子 is Japanese word for "electronics") is a small plastic box containing an electronic component. The blocks are used in some educational electronics kits, such as the Gakken EX-150, to allow experiments to be performed easily and safely.

== Description ==
The size and shape of denshi blocks depend on the kit they are from. The blocks of a particular kit will have the same height, usually a few centimetres, and cover a square or rectangular area a few centimetres on either side. They are designed to fit into a grid of squares, so blocks always occupy some rectangular area of these squares, with the majority of blocks occupying just one square.

Most blocks contain either a single electronic component, for example a resistor, just some wiring or both. Some unusual blocks contain complex circuitry, for example, a sound synthesiser in the Gakken EX-System or a microcomputer in the Gakken FX-System. Usually, a schematic representation of the block's contents is printed on its top.

On the sides of each block are conductive metal strips, so that when two blocks are placed side-by-side, their metal strips touch allowing electricity to flow between them.

A circuit is built by placing a configuration of denshi blocks in a two dimensional grid. The instructions for building the circuit need only illustrate where to place the blocks in the grid. Because of the two dimensional layout and the labels on the blocks, a configuration of blocks resembles a schematic of the circuit.

== See also ==
- Snap Circuits, a similar set of toys released in America

== External links and references ==
- (in Japanese) Denshi Blocks Mfg. Co. Ltd. Home Page
- (in English) Gakken's EX-150 Page
- Dostál, J. Electronic kits in education. Olomouc, EU: Votobia, 2008. 74 s. ISBN 978-80-7220-308-6.
