= Japan Energy =

Japanese petroleum company

Jomo logo designed by Saul Bass in 1994

Japan Energy Corporation (株式会社ジャパンエナジー, Kabushiki-gaisha Japan Enajī) was a Japanese petroleum company, a wholly owned subsidiary of Nippon Mining Holdings (now JXTG Nippon Mining & Metals). The petroleum products of Japan Energy Corporation were sold by filling stations under the brand name JOMO (for "joy of motoring").

Aside from petroleum, mining, electronic materials, and operations, the company was also involved in transportation, construction, and engineering industries.

== History ==
The predecessor to Japan Energy was first established in 1905 as a mining company in Hitachi, Ibaraki, which expanded into oil exploration in 1914. Namihei Odaira, an employee of the mining company, established Hitachi within the mine in 1908. The mine was renamed the Nippon Mining Company, Ltd. in 1929 following its integration into the Nissan Group the previous year.

In 1966, at the behest of the Ministry of International Trade and Industry, Nippon Mining's oil division merged its downstream business with those of unrelated oil companies Asia Oil and Toa Oil to form the Kyodo Oil Company, Ltd. (literally "Amalgamated Oil Company")

Nippon Mining and Kyodo Oil merged in 1992 following financial losses in the latter. Originally called Nikko Kyodo Company, Ltd.; it was renamed Japan Energy Corporation the following year. Simultaneously with the merger, Nikko Kyodo established a separate company for its mining business called Nippon Mining & Metals Company, Ltd.. In 2002, both companies established Nippon Mining Holdings, Inc. as its holding company. While the two companies continued to exist, they were delisted.

By late 2003, Japan Energy Corporation was part of a consortium that began exploring the natural gas field off the Aomori coast. In 2010, Nippon Mining merged with Nippon Oil to become JX Holdings, and the petroleum assets of both Japan Energy and Nippon Oil were reorganized into two companies, JX Nippon Oil & Energy and JX Nippon Oil & Gas Exploration.

== See also ==
- ampm - ampm Japan was a subsidiary of Kyodo Oil/Japan Energy until 2004
- Energy in Japan
