= Snap Circuits =

Children's electronic kit

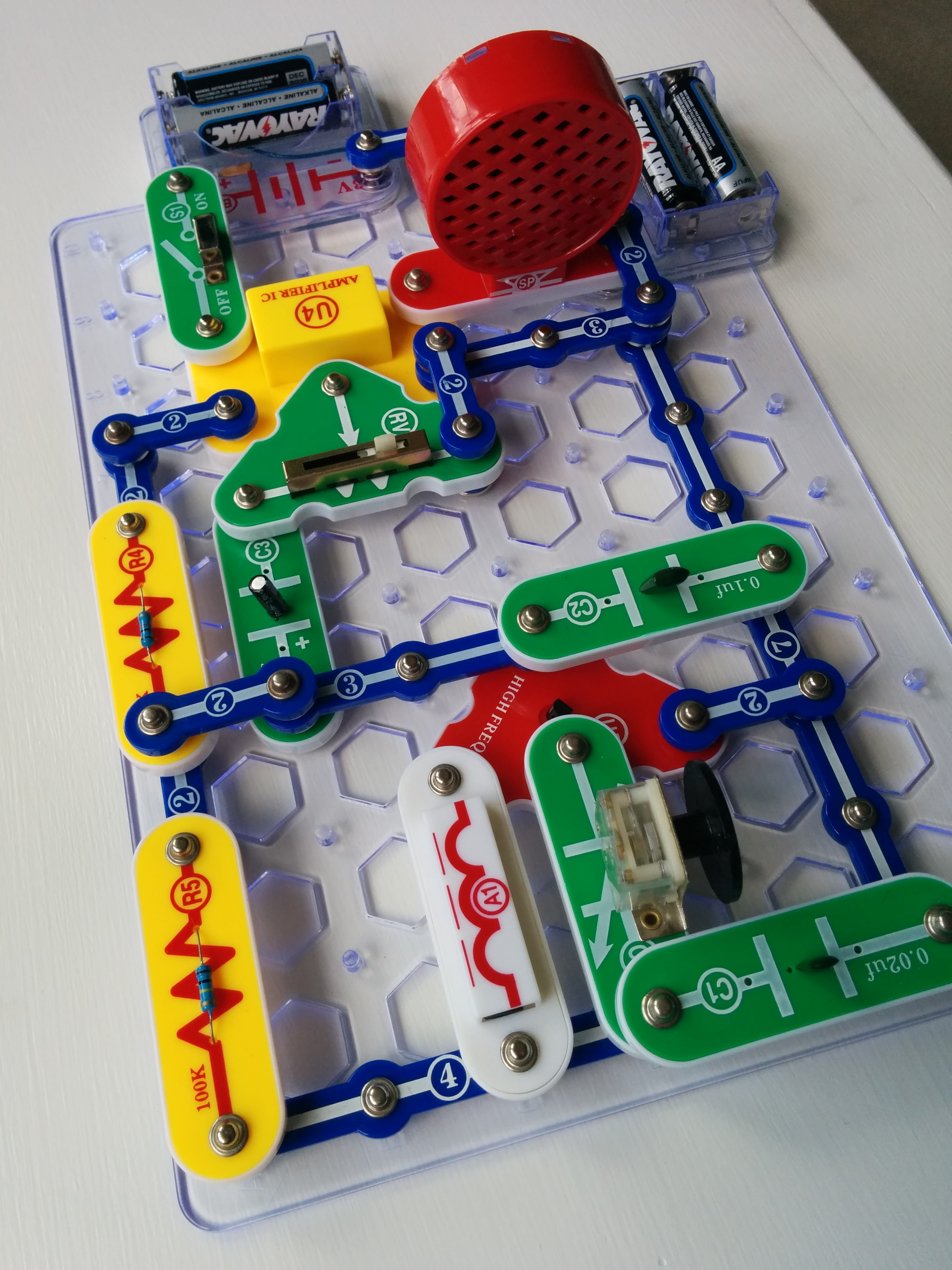
An AM radio made from a Snap Circuits kit

Released in 2002, Snap Circuits is a line of electronic kits manufactured by Elenco Electronics and aimed at children eight years and older. The kits come in a variety of sizes, and include capacitors, diodes, electric motors, lamps, LEDs, radios, electromagnets, speakers, resistors, transformers, transistors and voltmeters. The kits contain a plastic baseboard into which the various components and wires can be snapped to easily create a working circuit.

Snap Circuits has been praised for exposing young children to elementary engineering concepts. A related line entitled Snap Circuits Jr. is geared towards younger children. The different sets are all compatible with each other so you can combine sets and the company sells "upgrade" sets as well.

Newer kits include microcontrollers, LED drivers, audio and optical processor chips, programmable fans, and others.

Elenco was founded in 1972 and originally developed products for the testing of electronic equipment. It later developed educational materials for schools to provide hands-on experience in electronics building. A toy division was created in the late 1990s, and Snap Circuits, first released in 2002, soon grew in popularity. By 2015, Snap Circuits were among Amazon's Top 20 best selling toys. As of 2020, Snap Circuits have won more than 30 awards by different toy and industry groups.
