= Bertolotto =

Bertolotto is an Italian surname. Notable people with the surname include:

- Marco Bertolotto (born 1959), Italian doctor and politician
- Vincenzo Bertolotto (1912–1992), Italian rugby league and rugby union player

== See also ==
- Bertolotti
- Bortolotto
