= Maurizio Bortolotti =

Italian art critic and curator

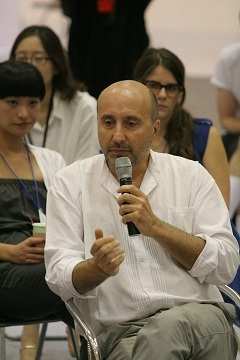
- Maurizio Bortolotti (2010)
- Born: 7 July 1961 (age 64); Brescia
- Occupation: Art curator

Maurizio Bortolotti (born Brescia, 7 July 1961) is an art critic, curator and researcher based between Milan, Italy and Shanghai, China.

He was director of Research and Public Program of Shanghai Project at Shanghai Himalayas Museum in Shanghai (2015-2016). He was Curator of the Zuecca Project Space International Program in Venice (2011–2014). He curated exhibitions in many countries, focusing on the interaction between art and social processes in the background of globalisation, investigating especially the interdisciplinary connection between art and architecture inside the urban space and its social relations. He worked as curator and advisor for several international biennials, and in 2010 served as Art Commissioner for the First International Art Fair Art Gwangju made by the Gwangju Biennale. He was a professor and a member of the scientific committee of the Media school at NABA (2007-2013) in Milan. He was visiting professor at University of Urbino (2003-2005). He was a regular contributor to the art and architecture magazine Domus (1991-2011).

He had lectures and public talks in different Art Institutions, like: Domus Academy, National Visual Arts Gallery (Malaysia), Goldsmiths College, University of Central England, University of Geneva, Gwangju Biennale, Triennale, MAXXI, Hongik University, Istanbul Biennial and many others.

== Publications ==
Bortolotti has authored many publications on the works of Yona Friedman, Peter Eisenman, Rirkrit Tiravanija, Dan Graham, Tomás Saraceno, Olafur Eliasson, Ai Weiwei, amongst the others. Amongst his publications:

- : The Critic as Curator, Milan, Silvana Editoriale (2003).
- : Unidentified Modern City, Zurich, Ringier (2011).
- : Village. One Land & Platform Paradise (with Malkit Shoshan) Bologna-New York City, DAP-Damiani (2014);
- : Ai Weiwei. Disposition, Cologne, Buchhandlung Walther König (2014).

== Curatorial Activities ==
- : Modelmania. With Olafur Eliasson, Kjetil Thorsen and Yona Friedman. September 2005. Venice, Italy. Telecom Italia Future Centre.
- : The Utopian Display. 2003-2006. Milan, Italy.
- : Yona Friedman. A project for MART. October 2006. Rovereto, Italy. MART.
- : Platform Paradise. 2008. Ein Hawd, Israel. Foundation for Achieving Seamless Territory (FAST).
- : Dan Graham: Models & Videos. 2010. Birmingham, United Kingdom. Eastside Projects.
- : Rirkrit Tiravanija. Rirkrit Tiravanija untitled (a study for Karl’s perfect day) or (the incomparable Karl Holmqvist). 2012. Venice, Italy. Zuecca Project Space.
- : Jose Maria Cano, Addio Capitalismo! 2013. Naples, Italy. PAN.
- : Ai Weiwei Disposition. 2013. Venice, Italy. Zuecca Project Space.
- : Peter Eisenman, Alper Aitac, Yenikapi Project, 2014. Venice, Italy. Zuecca Project Space.

== Notes ==
- Official website
