= Bortolotti =

Bortolotti is an Italian surname. Notable people with the surname include:

- Alfonso Bortolotti (1911–2005), Italian sculptor
- Cesare Bortolotti (1950–1990), Italian entrepeuner
- Enea Bortolotti (1896–1942), Italian mathematician
- Ettore Bortolotti (1866–1947), Italian mathematician
- Gianfranco Bortolotti (born 1959), Italian record producer and music manager
- Laura Bortolotti (born 1960), Italian former swimmer
- Lisa Bortolotti (born 1974), Italian philosopher
- Marco Bortolotti (born 1991), Italian tennis player
- Maurizio Bortolotti (born 1961), Italian art critic, curator and researcher
- Mirko Bortolotti (born 1990), Italian racing driver
- Simona Bortolotti (born 1994), Italian professional racing cyclist
- Timo Bortolotti (1889–1951), Italian sculptor
