= Aesc =

Aesc may refer to:

- Æsc, Old English for the ash tree; see Fraxinus
  - Æsc (rune) (ᚫ), a rune of the Anglo-Saxon fuþorc and a continuation of the Elder Fuþark ansuz (ᚨ)
  - Æ, a letter of the Old English alphabet
- Oisc of Kent, sometimes called Aesc, a legendary early leader of the Anglo-Saxon kingdom of Kent
- Automotive Energy Supply Corporation (AESC), manufacturer of lithium based batteries for electric vehicles
- Aesc., abbreviation for the tree genus Aesculus
