= Shanghai Project =

Multidisciplinary project

The Shanghai Project is a multidisciplinary ideas platform bringing together practitioners from a variety of disciplines, including art, architecture, design, film, performance, sound, as well as the humanities, social and natural sciences.

The inaugural edition of the Shanghai Project, under the co-artistic directorship of Yongwoo Lee, executive director of Shanghai Himalayas Museum, and Hans Ulrich Obrist, artistic director of Serpentine Galleries London, is organized by the Shanghai Himalayas Museum, and co-organized by the Shanghai International Culture Association, and supported by Envision Energy and Zendai Group.

== History ==
The Shanghai Project was founded in 2015 by Yongwoo Lee in partnership with Dai Zhikang. The first phase of Shanghai Project took place in 2016 at the Himalaya Center and Shanghai Himalayas Museum, its satellite venue at Zendai Zhujiajiao Art Museum, and various venues across Shanghai including Century Park in Pudong New District.

- 2016: Inaugural edition of Shanghai Project, Envision 2116, Co-Artistic Directors: Yongwoo Lee and Hans Ulrich Obrist.

== First edition of Shanghai Project (2016) ==
The inaugural edition of the Shanghai Project will launch on September 4, 2016, and take place over the duration of eleven months, ending in July 2017.

Taking "Envision 2116" as its theme, the festival gathering—from China and abroad—"artists, filmmakers, performers, musicians, designers, architects, writers (including journalists, bloggers, science fiction novelists, and poets), philosophers, historians, scientists, economists, geographers, sociologists, anthropologists, doctors, lawyers, engineers, hackers, and activists, all of whom will be dubbed 'researchers'", and the people of Shanghai to think, discuss, relate, and act on the sustainability of the humankind's futures in the 22nd century".

Phase one of the first edition includes exhibitions, gatherings, screenings, talks, workshops, an open call, a commissioned architectural pavilion, and public art installations across sites in Shanghai, as well as the annual International Biennial Association Conference in collaboration with the Power Station of Art from September 3–4, 2016.

Researchers of this phase included: Xu Bing, Jenova Chen, Otobong Nkanga, Douglas Coupland, Liam Gillick, Liu Yi, Sou Fujimoto, and Cildo Meireles, etc.

=== Shanghai Project Pavilion ===
The Shanghai Project invited Japanese architect Sou Fujimoto to design and construct a pavilion, titled "Envision Pavilion" and situated besides the Arata Isozaki-designed Shanghai Himalayas Center, to house various cultural activities and amenities.

=== Exhibitions program ===
The Shanghai Project's exhibitions program creates multiple narratives in response to the theme of "Envision 2116", through an open and flexible configuration of multi-media installations, taking place at different venues across Shanghai.

=== Shanghai Project Public Program ===
The Shanghai Project's public program includes a wide range of public activities, including performances, film and video screenings, discursive programs and participatory events. Notable ones include "Community Participation Program," a series of neighborhood events intended to open a dialogue between the city of Shanghai and its residents that launched on July 15, 2016, joint programs with Jifeng Bookstore and Shanghai Flaneur, as well as a children's program located in Century Park.

=== Qidian, Shanghai Project Open Call ===
"Qidian," which loosely translates into "starting point", is an nationwide open call designed to tap into the talent and interests of China's new generation, which is based on the long-term international project "89plus" (co-curated by Simon Castets and Hans Ulrich Obrist in collaboration with Katherine Dionysius).
