= Nissan Leaf =

Battery electric car

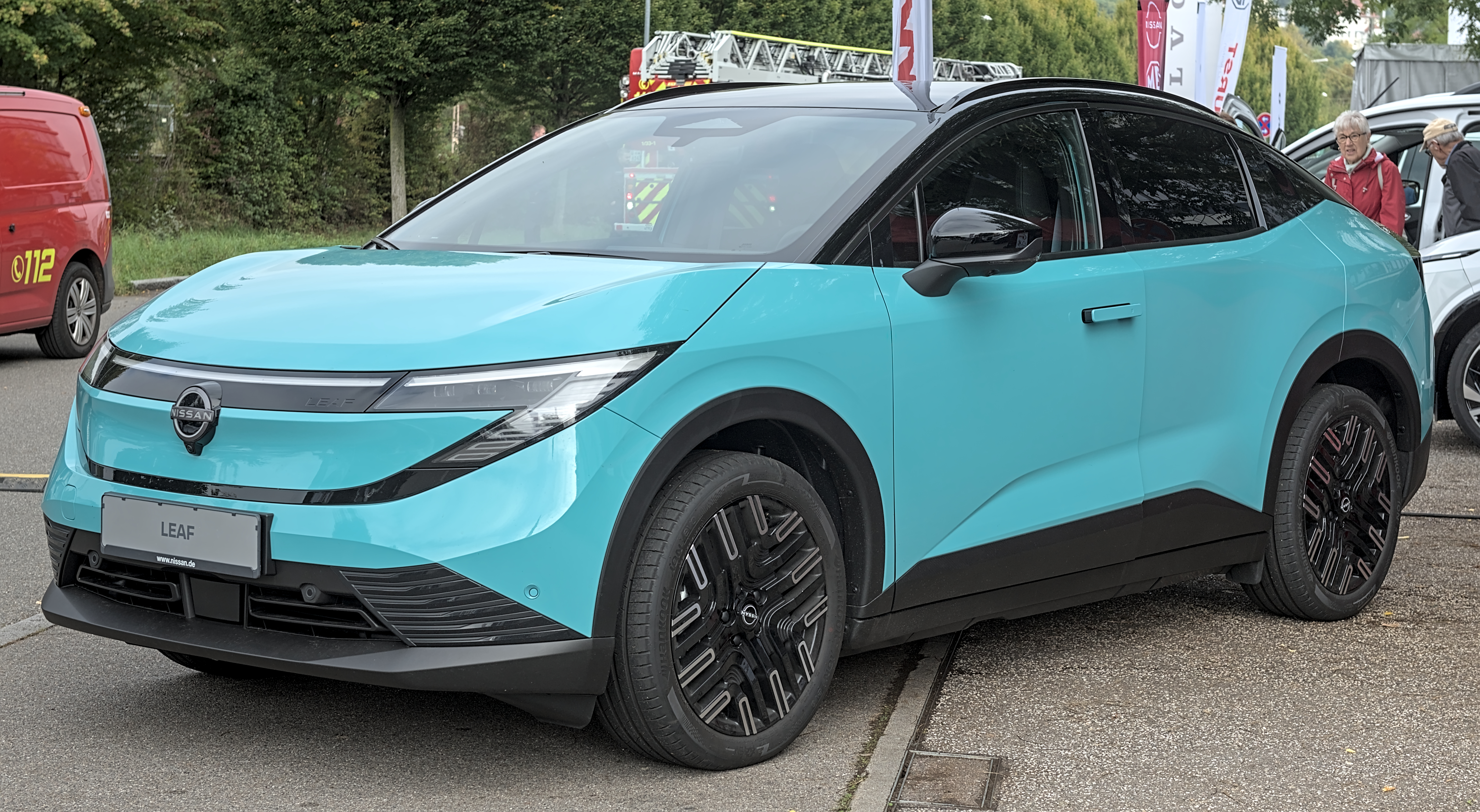
- Third generation Nissan Leaf

Overview
- Manufacturer: Nissan
- Production: October 2010 – present
- Model years: 2011–present

Body and chassis
- Class: Compact/Small family car (C) (2010–2025); Subcompact crossover SUV (2025–present)
- Body style: 5-door hatchback (2010–2025); 5-door coupe SUV (2025–present)
- Layout: Front-motor, front-wheel-drive

Chronology
- Predecessor: Nissan Altra; Nissan Hypermini

The Nissan Leaf (Japanese: 日産・リーフ, Hepburn: Nissan Rīfu; stylized as LEAF) is a battery electric car produced by Nissan since 2010. It was offered exclusively as a 5-door hatchback until 2025, when it became a crossover SUV model. The term "LEAF" serves as a backronym to leading environmentally-friendly affordable family car.

The Leaf was unveiled on 1 August 2009 as the world's first mass market electric and zero-emission vehicle. Among other awards and recognition, it received the 2010 Green Car Vision Award, the 2011 European Car of the Year, the 2011 World Car of the Year, and the 2011–2012 Car of the Year Japan. The Leaf's range on a full charge has been steadily increased from 117 km (73 miles) to 364 km (226 miles) (EPA rated) by the use of larger battery packs and several minor improvements.

As of September 2021, European sales totalled more than 208,000, and as of December 2021, over 165,000 had been sold in the U.S., and 157,000 in Japan. Global sales across both generations totalled 577,000 by February 2022. The Leaf was the world's all-time top selling plug-in electric car until it was surpassed in early 2020 by the Tesla Model 3.

== First generation (ZE0; 2010) ==
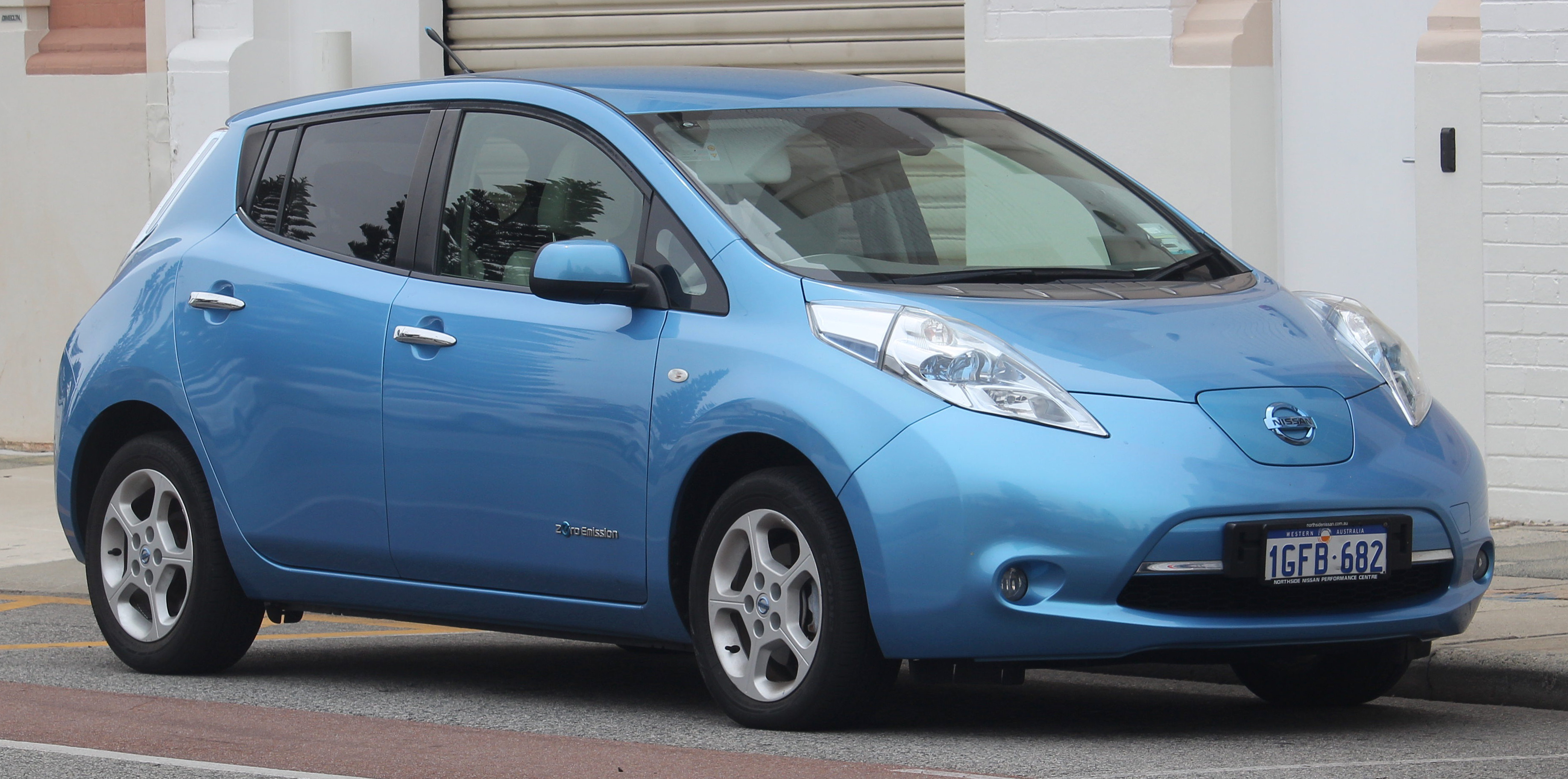
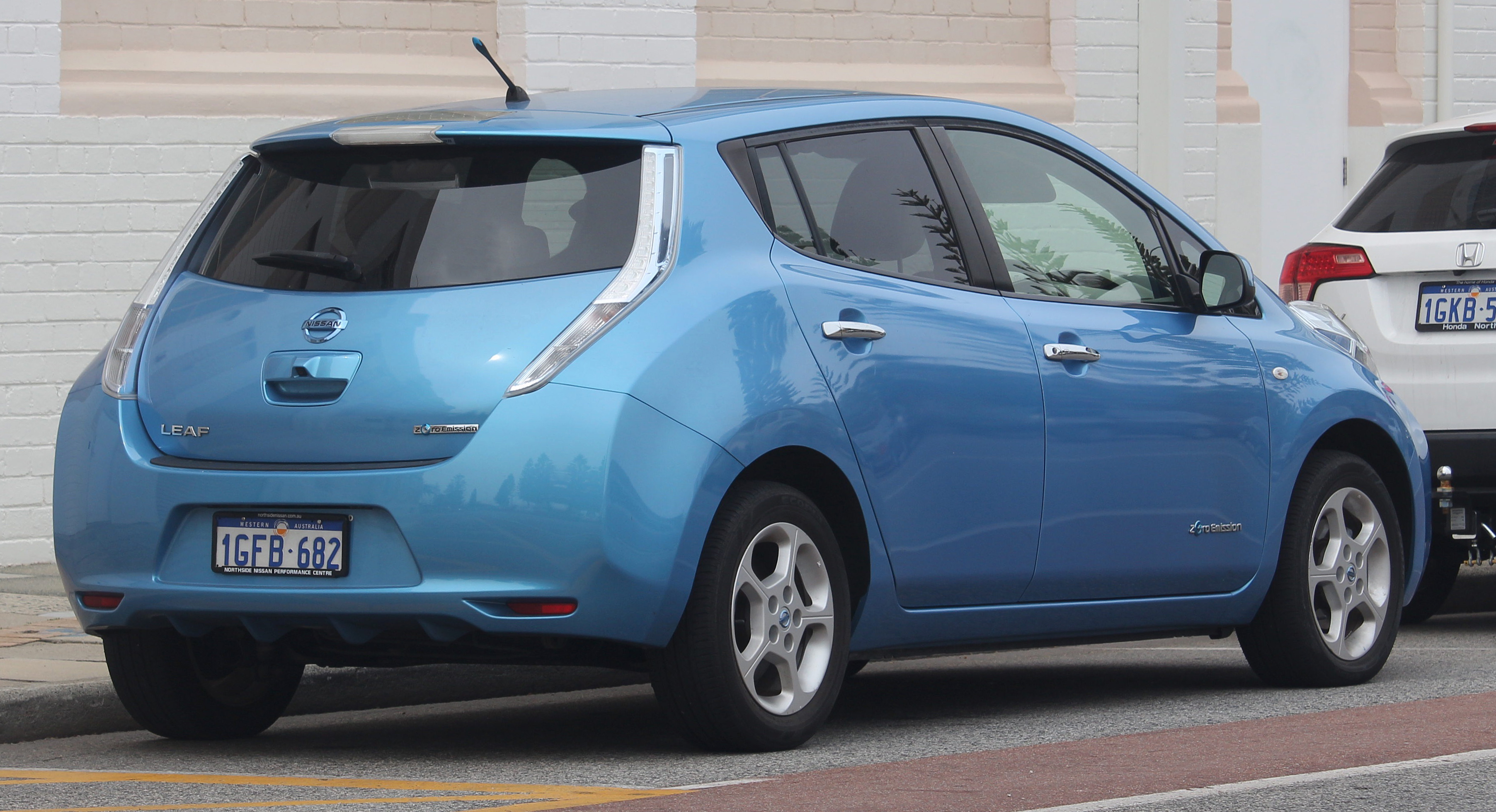
2013 Nissan Leaf (Australia)

The first generation Nissan Leaf was in production from 2010 to 2017. It was unveiled on 1 August 2009 as the world's first series produced battery electric vehicle. Before it officially commenced production, Nissan developed three prototype battery electric vehicles—dubbed the EV-01, EV-02 and EV-11. The former two were based on the Z11 Nissan Cube while the latter was based on the C11 Nissan Tiida.

The Leaf production began on 22 October 2010 at the Oppama facility in Yokosuka, Kanagawa. Until early 2013, models sold in Europe and the US were imported from the Oppama plant adapted stylistically for the respective markets. On 12 December 2012, battery manufacturing began at the Smyrna plant, with official production of the Leaf initiating on 9 January 2013. Manufacturing in the UK began on 28 March 2013.

Initially, the Leaf was available exclusively with a large battery pack composed of 192 flat, laminated lithium-ion cells developed in collaboration with NEC, which offers advantages such as simplified design, efficient cooling, and optimal packaging. The battery pack is located under the floor and between the wheels, optimising the vehicle's handling and interior space. The electric motor produces 80 kW (110 hp) of power with a range of about 160 km (100 miles) when the battery is fully charged. Recharging can take 16 hours on 120 V or 8 hours on 230 V power. Fast charging is also available with a specific charger, which can restore 80% of the battery capacity in approximately 30 minutes.

The first generation Leaf garnered both acclaim and criticism from multiple automotive critics. Car and Driver, an American automotive magazine, expressed unfavourable opinions about the inexpensive materials used in the vehicle, asserting that they seem more fitting for a car priced at half its actual cost. However, they commended the Leaf for its spacious boot, along with features like standard heated seats and, in higher-end models, a heated steering wheel and leather seats. Opinions on the battery performance and safety aspects vary, with some finding the battery and range underwhelming and others expressing concerns about safety levels.

== Second generation (ZE1; 2017) ==
Second generation
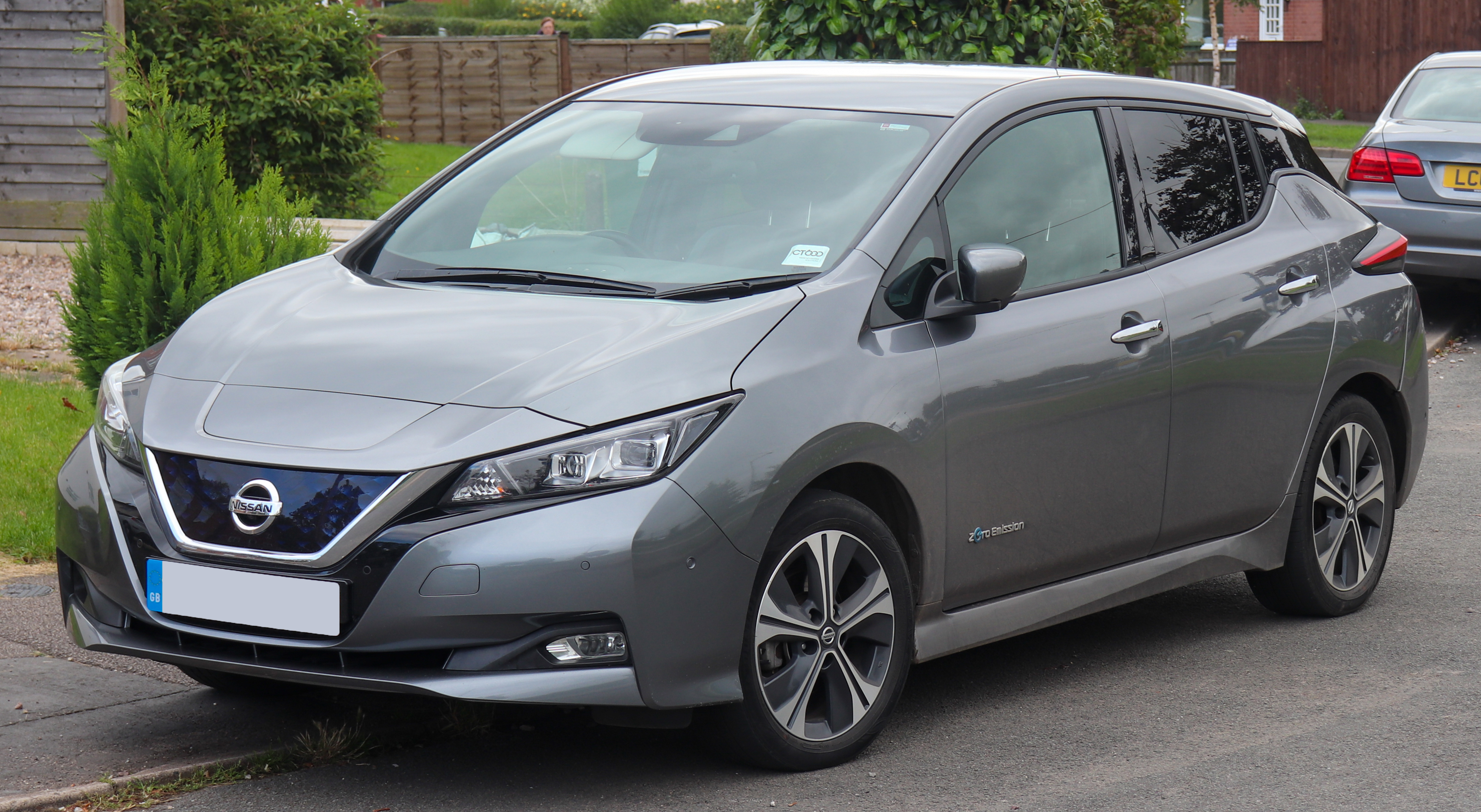
- 2018 Nissan Leaf N-Connecta (UK)

Overview
- Model code: ZE1
- Production: October 2017 – October 2025
- Model years: 2018 – 2025
- Assembly: Japan: Yokosuka, Kanagawa (Oppama Plant); United States: Smyrna, Tennessee (Nissan Smyrna Assembly Plant); United Kingdom: Sunderland (NMUK)
- Designer: Kazuhiko Watanabe

Powertrain
- Electric motor: 110 or 160 kW EM57, synchronous
- Transmission: Single-speed fixed (8.193:1 ratio)
- Battery: 40 or 62 kWh lithium-ion
- Range: 40 kWh: EPA: 240 km (149 miles); WLTP: 274 km (170 miles); 62 kWh: EPA: 341 km (212 miles)
- Plug-in charging: AC onboard charger: 6.6 kW at 27.5 A; DC: 50 or 100 kW; J1772 or Type 2 and CHAdeMO connectors

Dimensions
- Wheelbase: 2,700 mm (106.3 in)
- Length: 4,490 mm (176.8 in)
- Width: 1,788 mm (70.4 in)
- Height: 1,530 mm (60.2 in)
- Kerb weight: 1,580–1,640 kg (3,483–3,616 lb)

In October 2017, for the 2018 model year, Nissan launched the new generation Leaf in Japan, and deliveries in North America and Europe began in February 2018. In 2018, global sales reached a record level of 87,149 units, third behind the Tesla Model 3 and the BAIC EC-Series.

Mechanically, the second generation Leaf is similar to the first, while adding more range, and more power, while departing stylistically. The interior adds Android Auto & Apple CarPlay.

With a 40 kWh battery pack (39 kWh usable) with an EPA-rated range of 243 km (151 miles), The electric motor produces 110 kW (147 hp) and 320 N⋅m (236 lb⋅ft) of torque. the Leaf charges through either a 6.6 kW regular plug (SAE J1772 in US/Japan, or a Type 2 connector in EU countries) or a 50 kW CHAdeMO, and has the ability to send power back to the grid.

Propilot Assist, a lane centering system, is optional on the two highest trims, with automatic parking in some markets. The Leaf offers one-pedal braking where easing off the accelerator pedal engages significant regenerative braking, able to completely stop without engaging the brake pedal, at which point hydraulic brakes are automatically applied, to hold the vehicle in position.

From 2019, a Leaf e+ (Leaf Plus in North America) variant was offered with a larger 62 kWh battery (59 kWh usable) providing an EPA range of 364 km (226 miles), and a new 160 kW motor. It can use CHAdeMO chargers up to 100 kW.

In September 2020, Nissan presented a novel UK prototype emergency services version of the Leaf for natural disaster response, dubbed the RE-LEAF, based on the 62 kWh LEAF e+ (sold in the U.S. as the Plus). The working concept vehicle is ruggedized with an elevated ride height of 70 mm (2.8 in), underbody protection and all-terrain tires on motorsport wheels. It is intended to serve as a reliable mobile power source for a small command centre, offering weatherproof external power outlets for site lighting, tools or emergency medical equipment. Other modifications include a cargo area in place of the rear seats, separated from the passenger area by a cage, a rear hatch area that opens to a workstation area with pull-out computer desk and 810 mm (32 in) LCD monitor, and roof-mounted emergency lights. While there was no word of an actual production version, the concept was well received in the automotive, EV and tech media.

In June 2022, the Leaf received a facelift for the 2023 model year. In the US, the EPA range was slightly reduced to 240 km (149 miles) for the 40 kWh version and 341 km (212 miles) for the 62 kWh version.

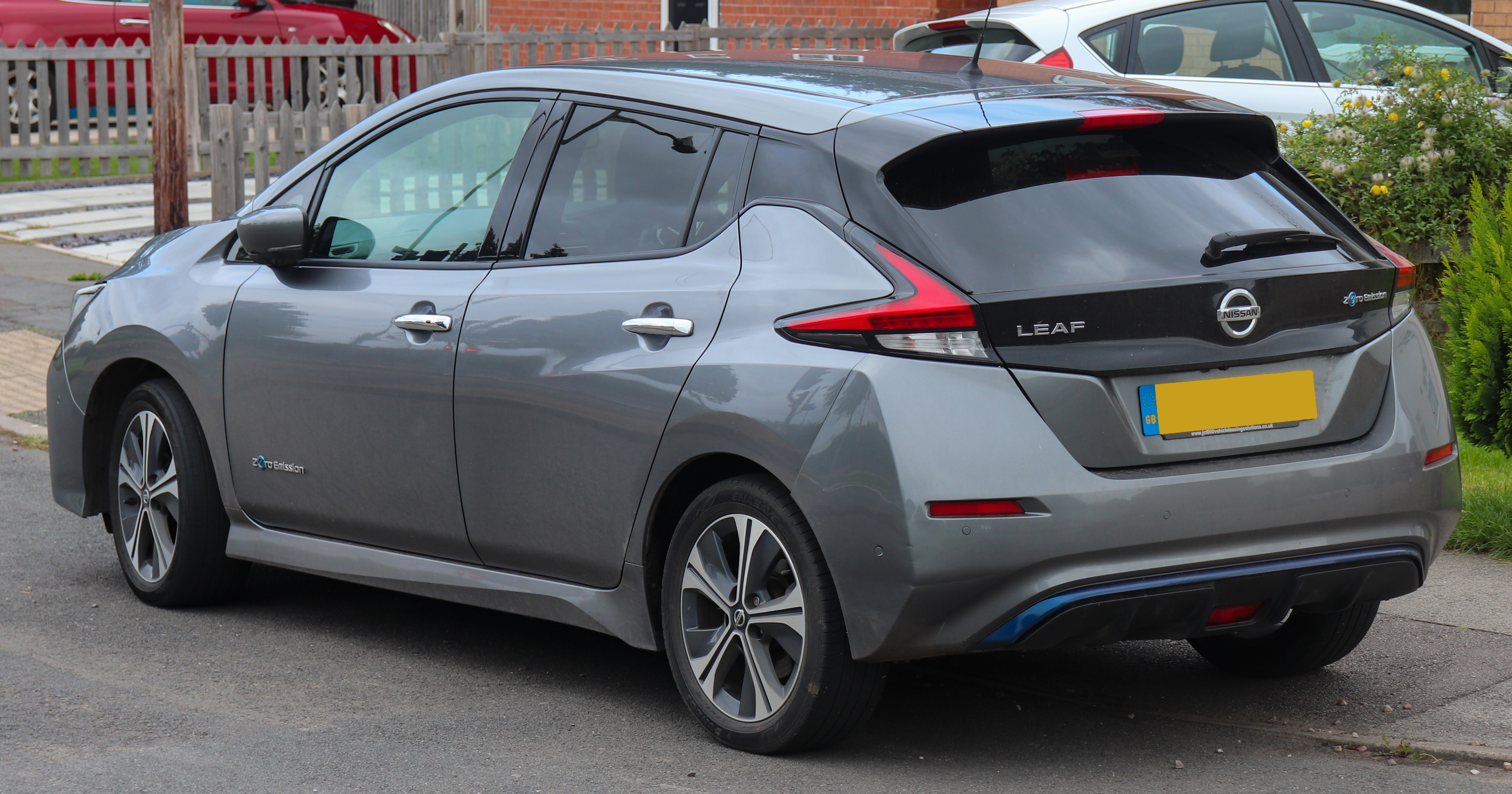
Rear view (UK)

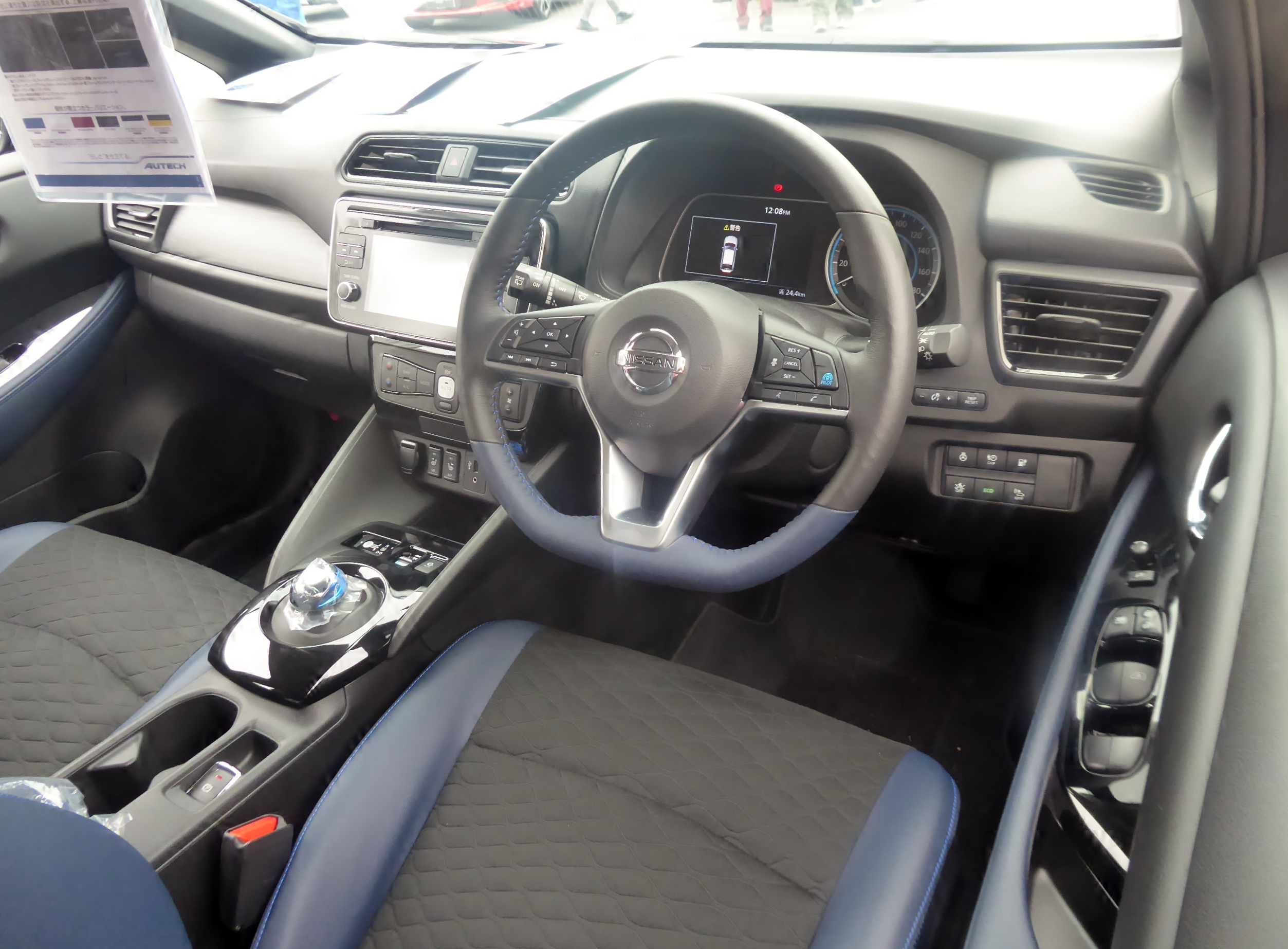
2018 pre-facelift interior

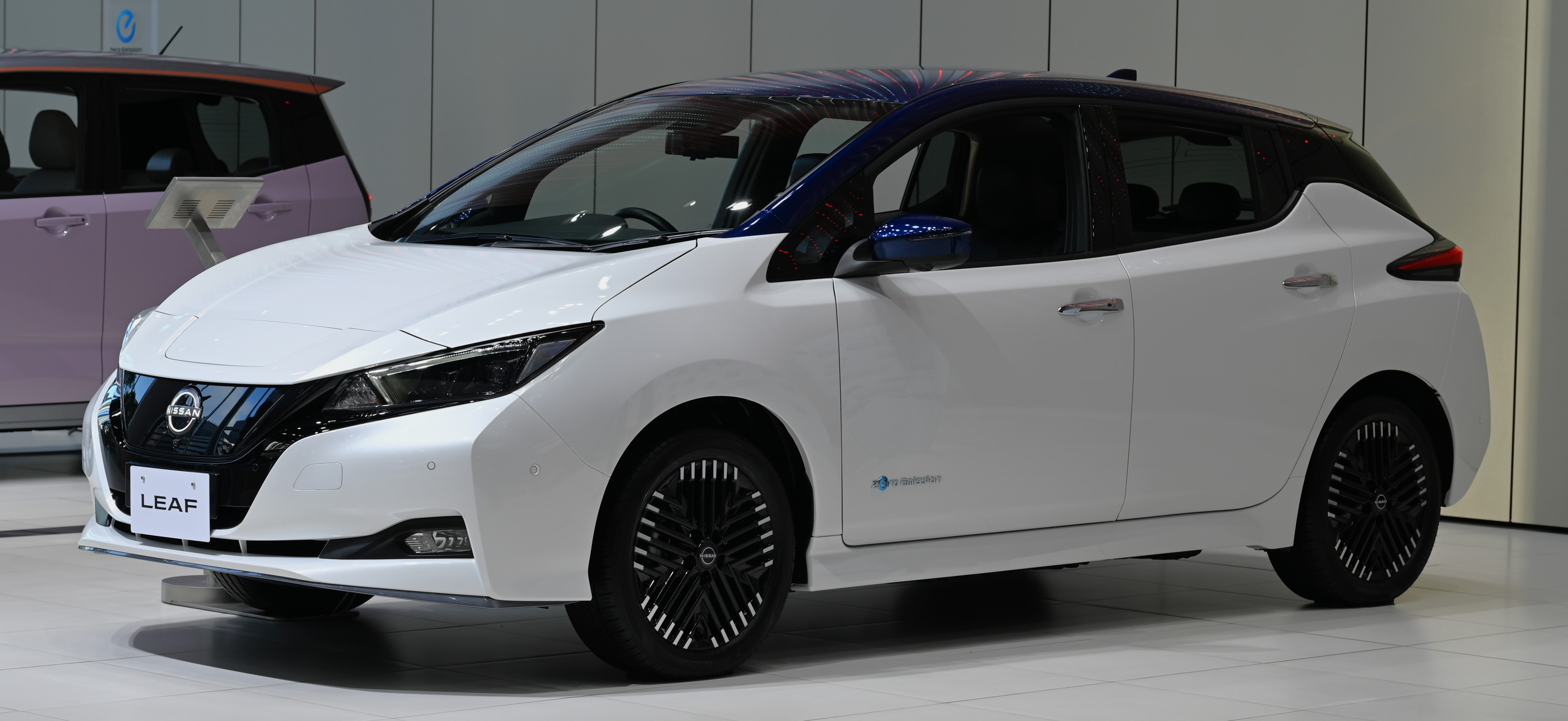
2022 Nissan Leaf e+ G (facelift)

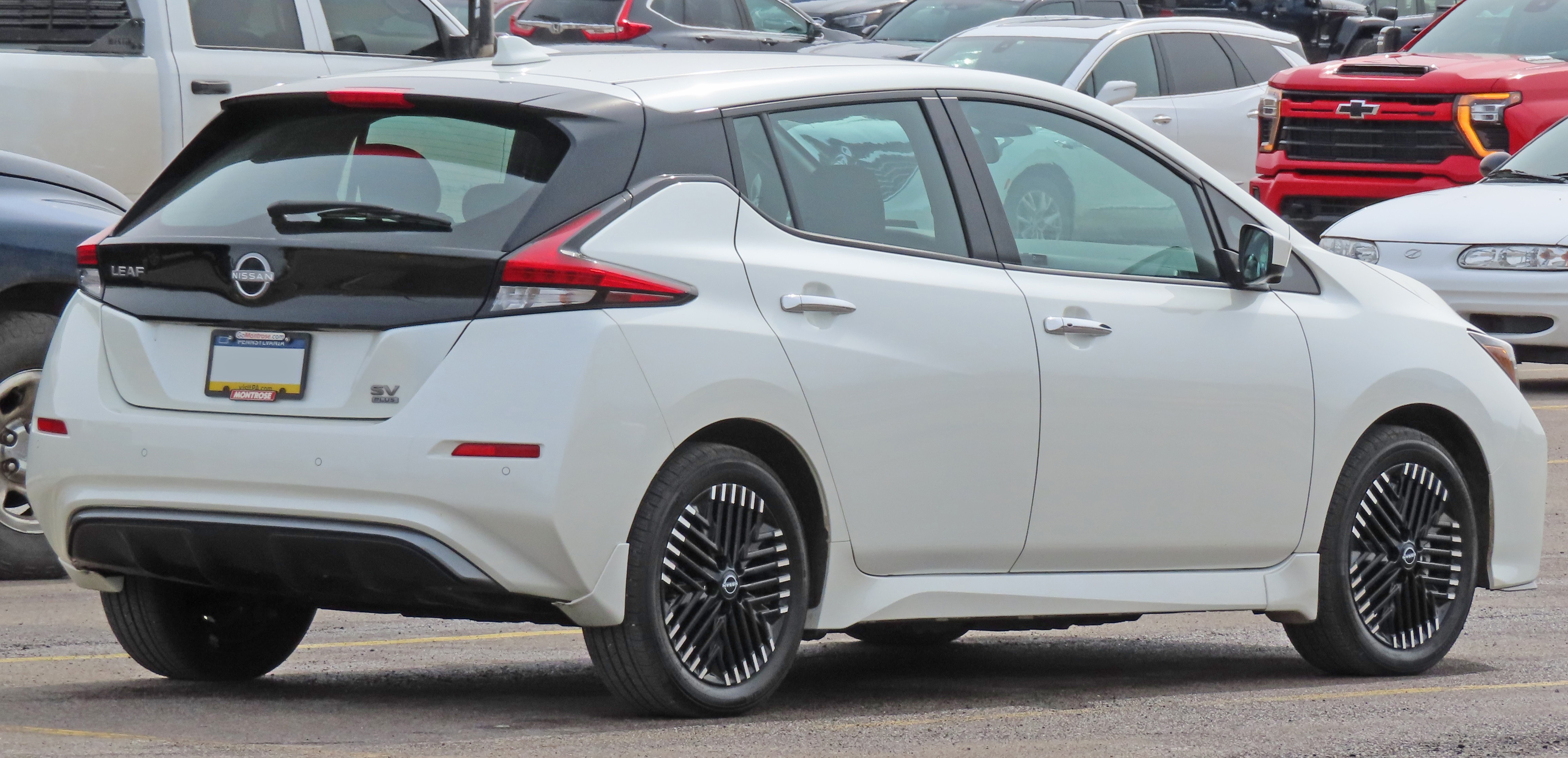
Rear view (facelift)

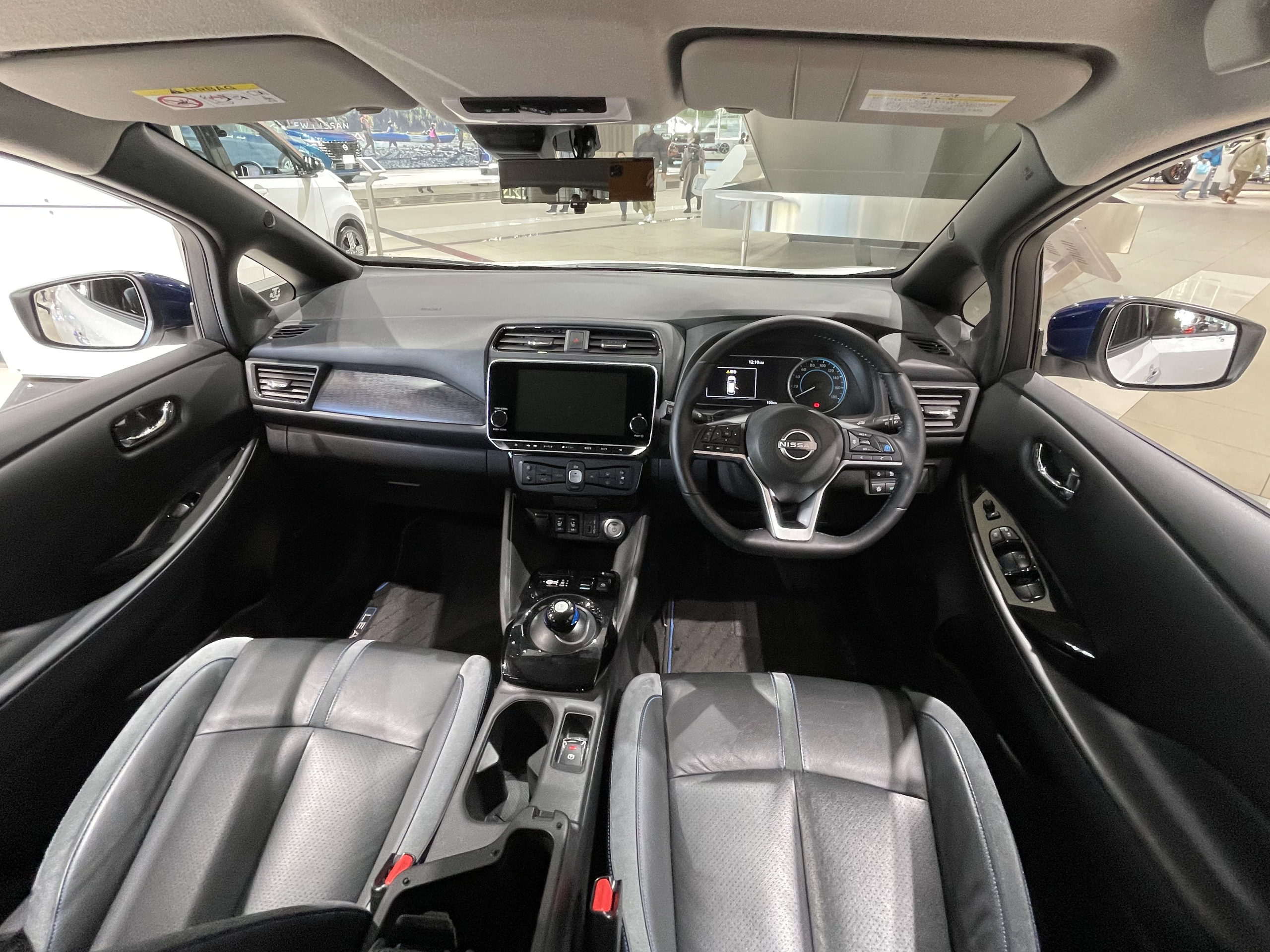
2022 facelift Interior

=== Trim lines ===
==== Japan ====
Initially, the Japanese-spec Leaf are offered in 3 trim: S, X, and G.

In 2018, the Nismo Variant was released. The exterior features a more sportier design, and the aluminium wheels have been changed to a special 18-inch size that is larger in diameter, lighter, and has reduced air resistance on the wheel surface. The body colour is available in nine variations, including two two-tone colours with the specially offered "Super Black."

In January 2019, the enlarged battery e+ (e-Plus) was added. It was equipped with a 62 kWh battery. It was offered in 2 grades: e+ X, and e+ G.

Like most other Nissan models in Japan, the Autech was added in May 2019. It was available in all e+ variants.

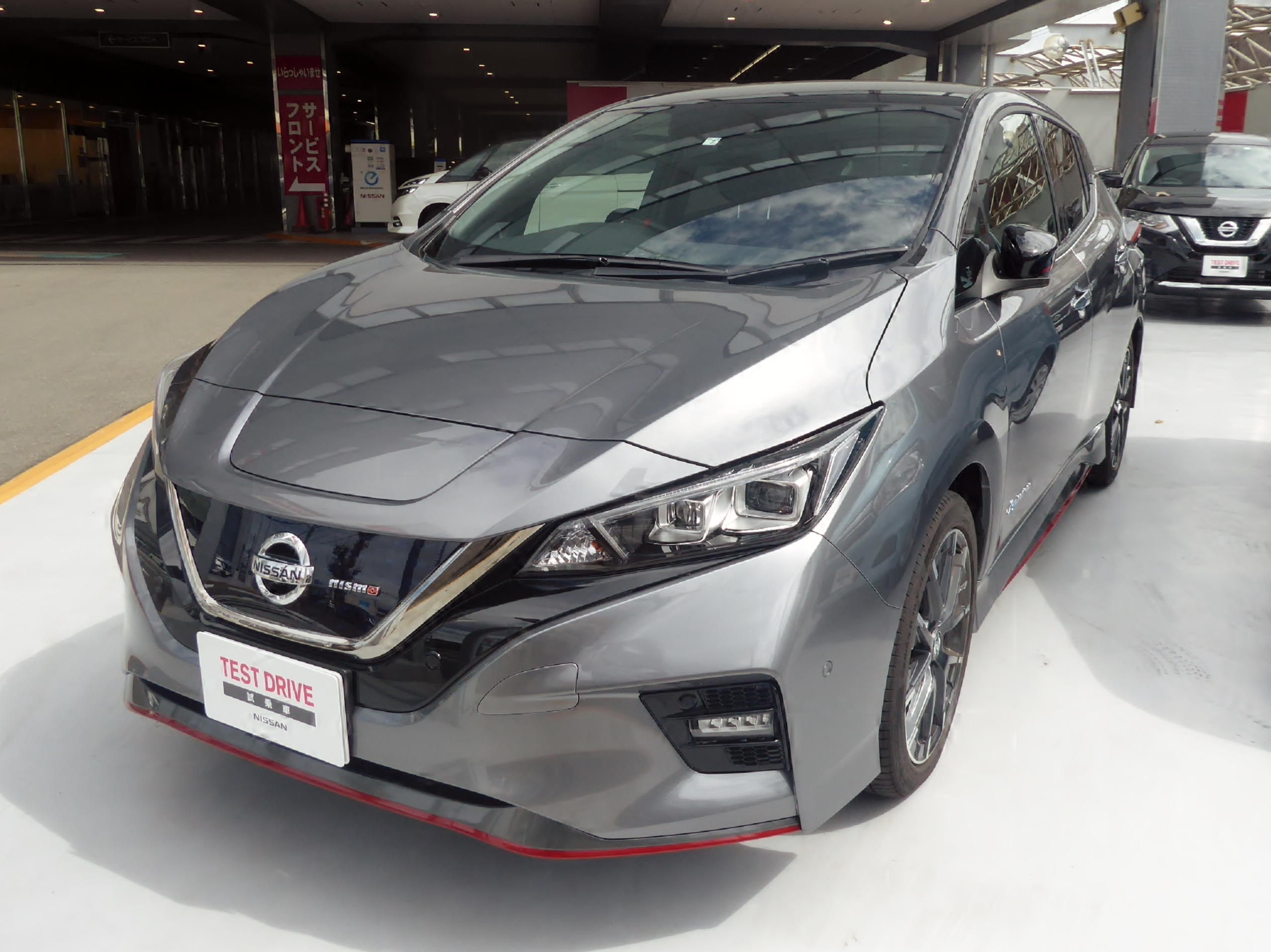
2018 Nissan Leaf Nismo (pre-facelift)

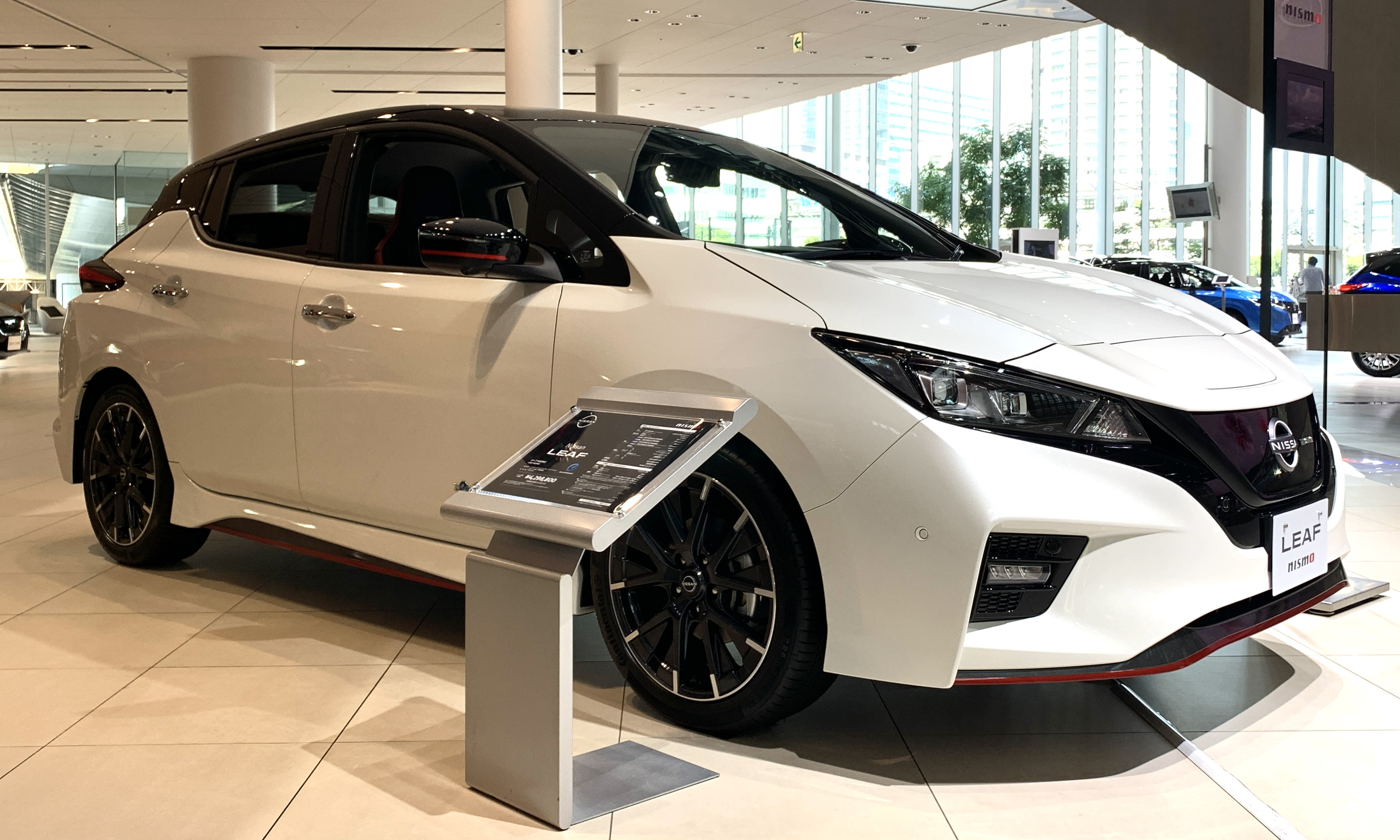
2021 Nissan Leaf e+ Nismo (Japan, facelift)

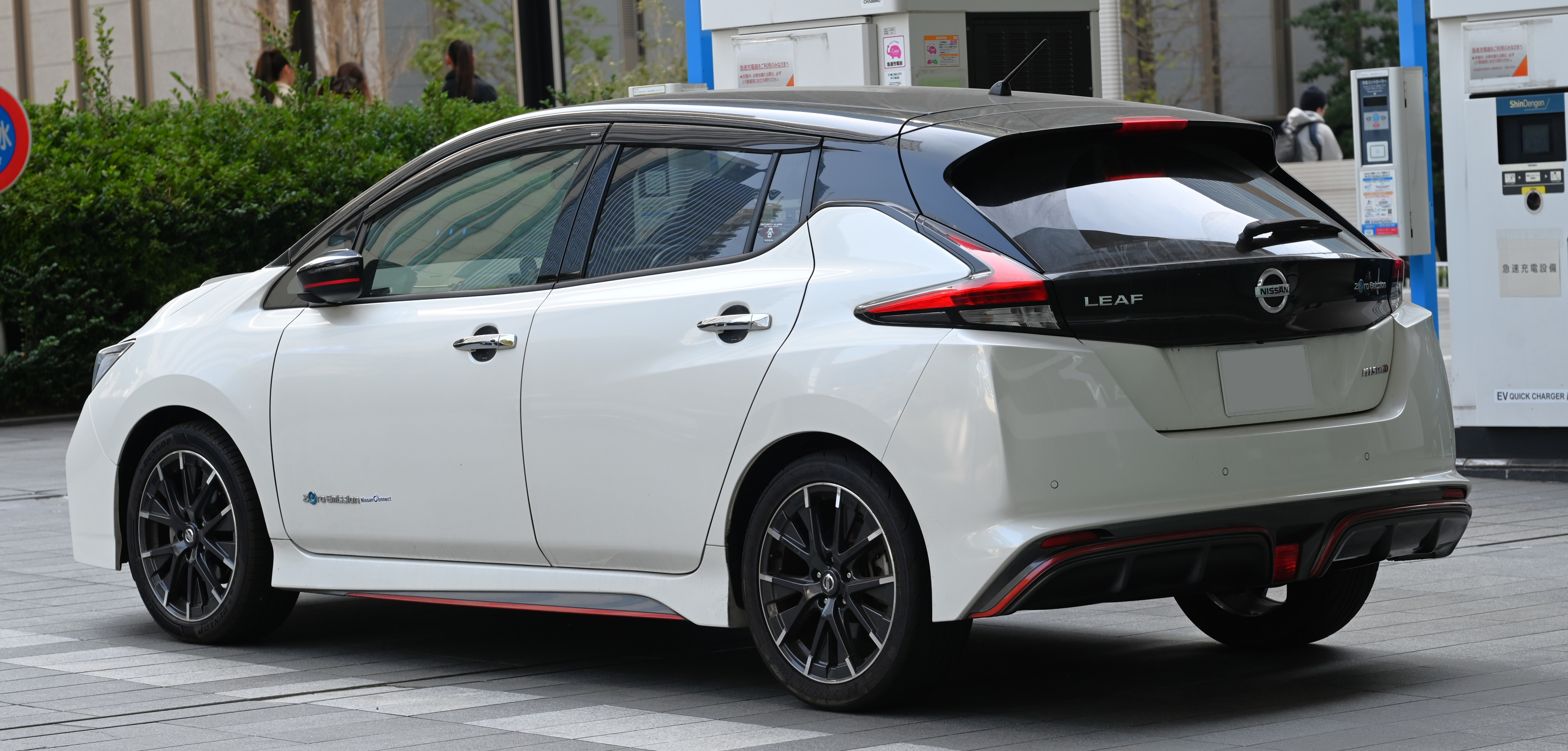
Leaf Nismo (rear view)

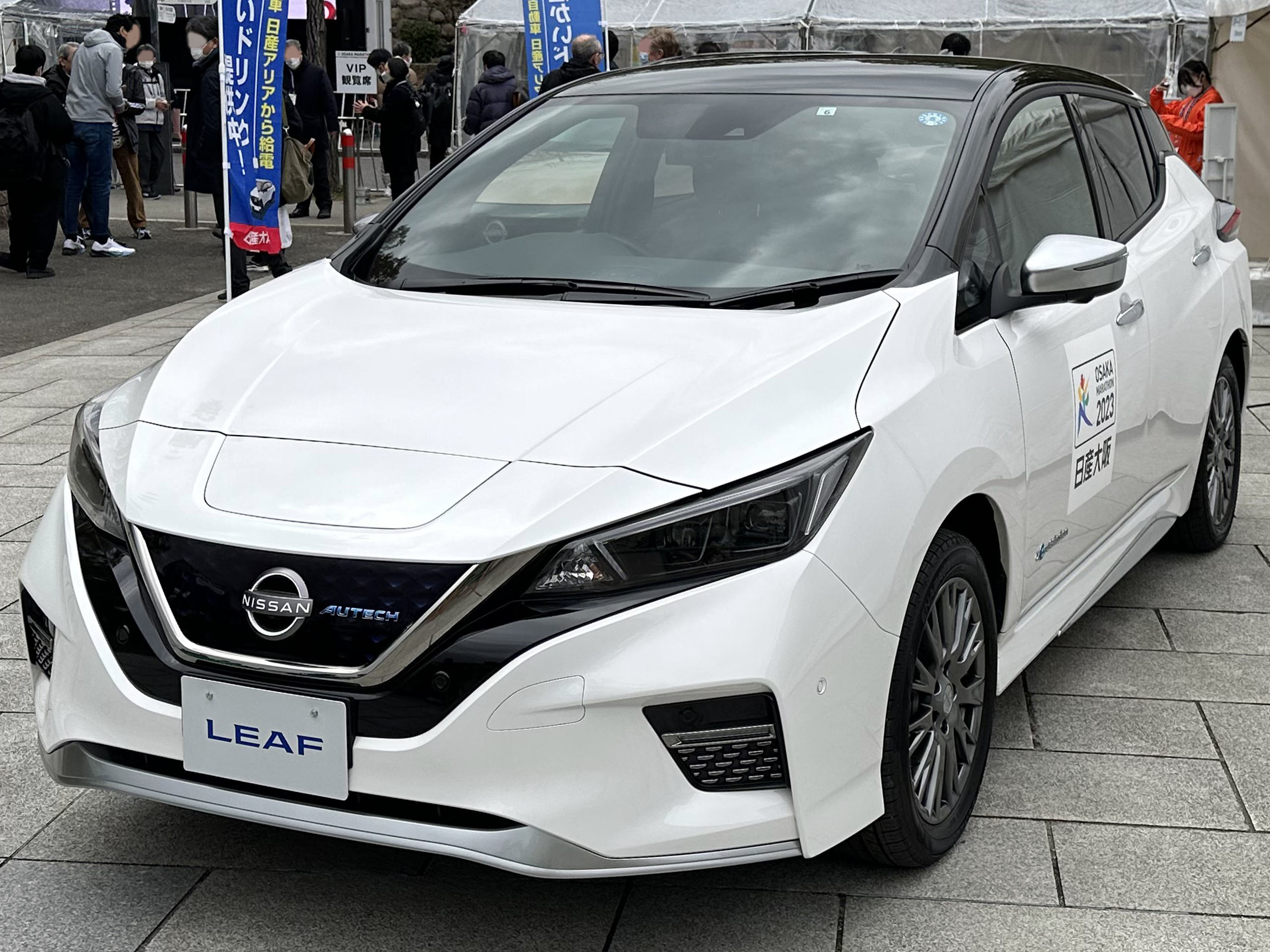
2022 Nissan Leaf e+ Autech (Japan, facelift)

==== Europe ====
European Leafs are offered in the following trim lines: Visia, Acenta, N-Connecta, and Tekna.

The N-Connecta adds from Acenta an intelligent around view monitor with moving object detection and front and rear parking sensors, part synthetic leather and cloth trim, heat pack with heated seats and heated steering wheel, 43 centimetre (17 inch) alloy wheels, and privacy glass.

Tekna adds from N-Connecta ProPILOT Advanced Driver Assistance System, Bose speakers, part leather seats with Ultrasuede trim, LED fog lamps with cornering function, and electronic parking brake.

==== North America ====
The North American Leafs were initially sold in S, SV and SL trim lines. In 2018, for the 2019 model year, the S Plus, SV Plus, and SL Plus trims were added. The S and SV trim levels can be had with either the Leaf or Leaf Plus battery pack. The SL is only available in the Leaf Plus configuration.

The Mexican model arrived on 24 August 2018 as a 2019 model, and was offered in S, SL, and SL Bitono trim lines.

=== Production ===
In celebration of World EV Day, 9 September 2020, Nissan marked the production of the 500,000th LEAF.

UK production ceased in March 2024, after 270,000 units produced in Sunderland plant, both generations included.

=== Safety ===
ANCAP test results* Nissan Leaf 40kWh variants only (2018, aligned with Euro NCAP)
Test	Points	%
Overall:	5 /5 stars	
Adult occupant:	35.3	93%
Child occupant:	41.8	85%
Pedestrian:	34.2	71%
Safety assist:	9.2	70%

=== Awards ===
The Leaf was chosen as one of the Top 10 Tech Cars by the US IEEE in 2018.

In 2022, the Leaf was chosen as the 'Best Family Electric Car' at the UK Carbuyer’s Best Used Car Awards.

=== Nissan Leaf Nismo RC ===
Second generation Leaf Nismo RC
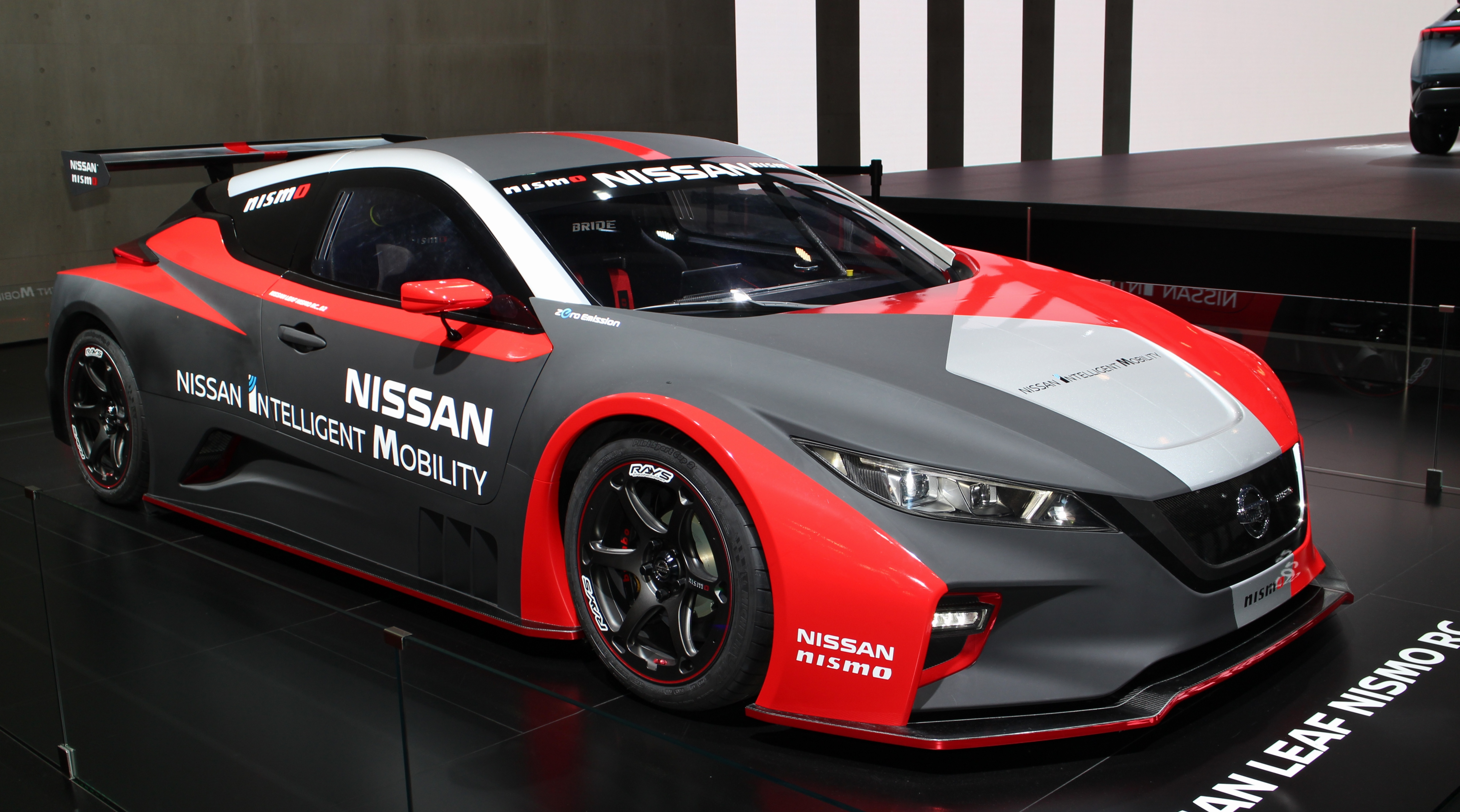

Overview
- Model code: ZE1

Body and chassis
- Class: 2-door fastback coupe
- Layout: Four-wheel drive

Powertrain
- Electric motor: 120 kW EM57, synchronous motor ×2

Dimensions
- Wheelbase: 2,750 mm (108.3 in)
- Length: 4,446 mm (175.0 in)
- Width: 1,942 mm (76.5 in)
- Height: 1,212 mm (47.7 in)
- Kerb weight: 1,220 kg (2,690 lb)

The second-generation Leaf RC was unveiled on 30 November 2018. A total of 6 units of Leaf Nismo RCs were allocated for promotional purposes.

The previous model was rear-heavy because the rear was made of steel despite its low ride height. The weight has been improved by changing the entire body to a CFRP monocoque body, and the subframe has been made 25% lighter than the steel. The roll cage has been reinforced by wrapping CFRP around steel pipes, which has also contributed to reducing its size and weight.

While the design is characteristic of a race car, it shares many similarities with the regular Leaf. The headlights, V-motion grille, and front and rear windows are almost the same shape, but it is distinguished by its long bonnet, large rear wing, and large wings.

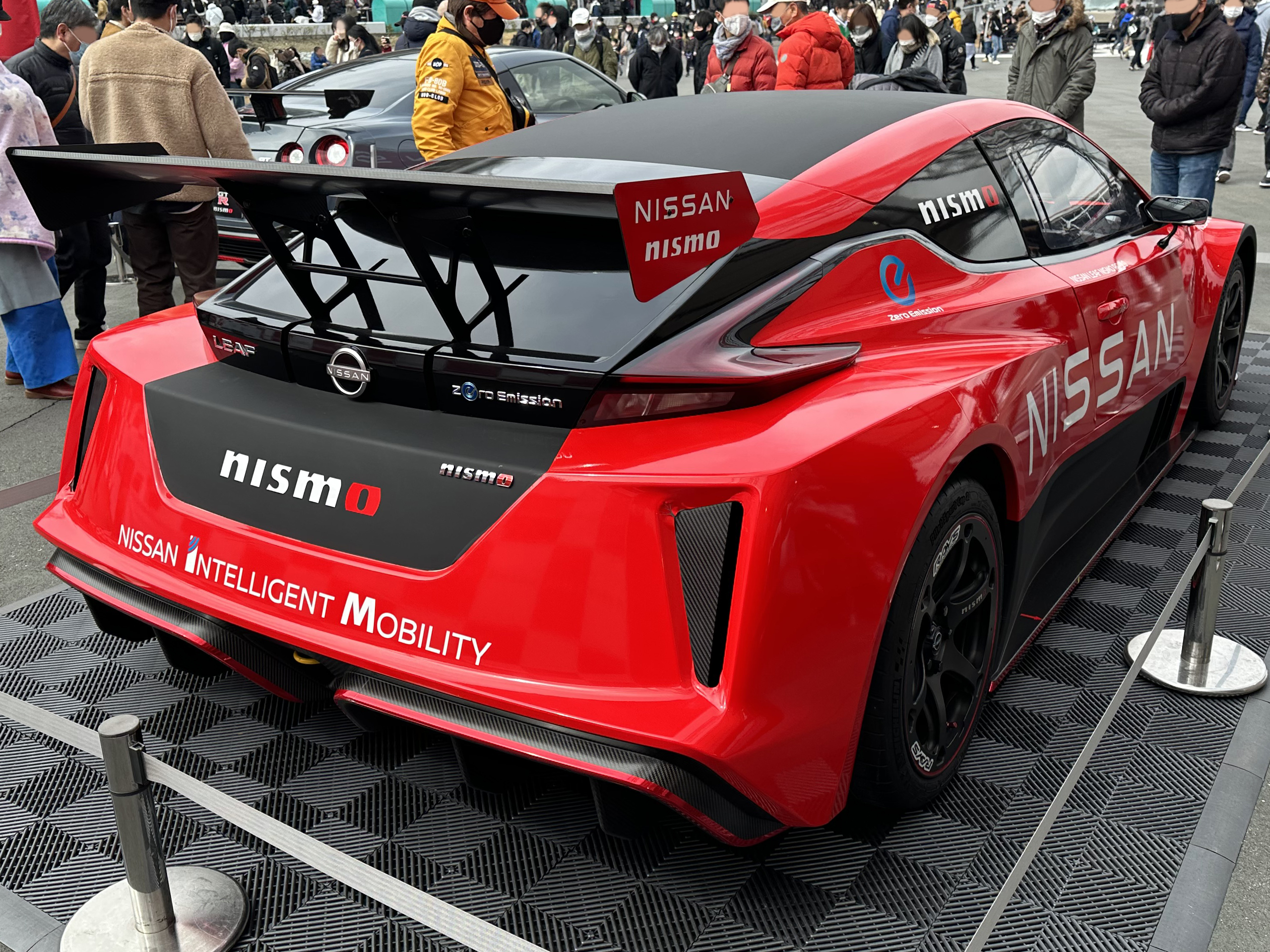
Rear view

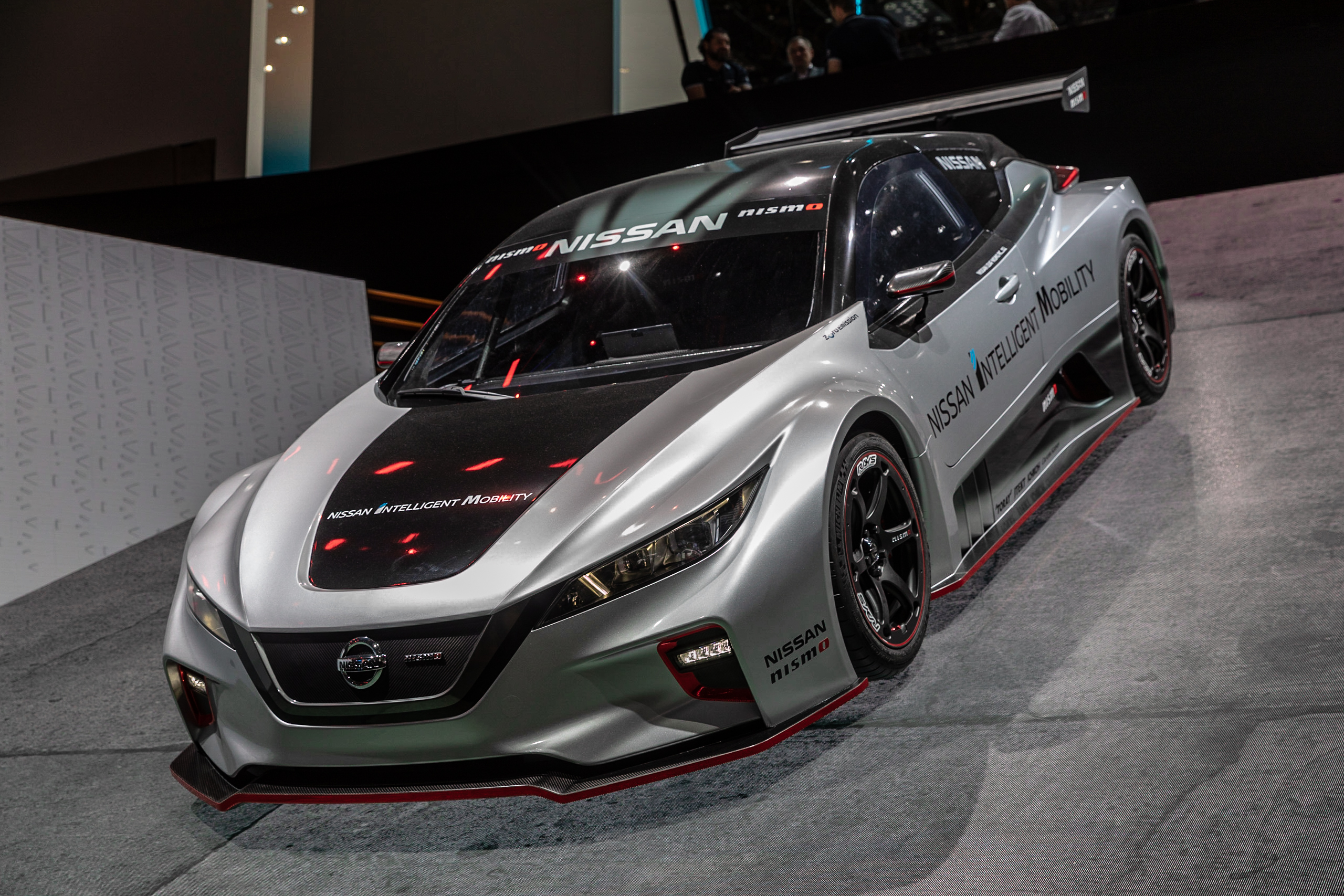
Nissan Leaf Nismo RC (with original white colour)

== Third generation (ZE2; 2025) ==
Third generation
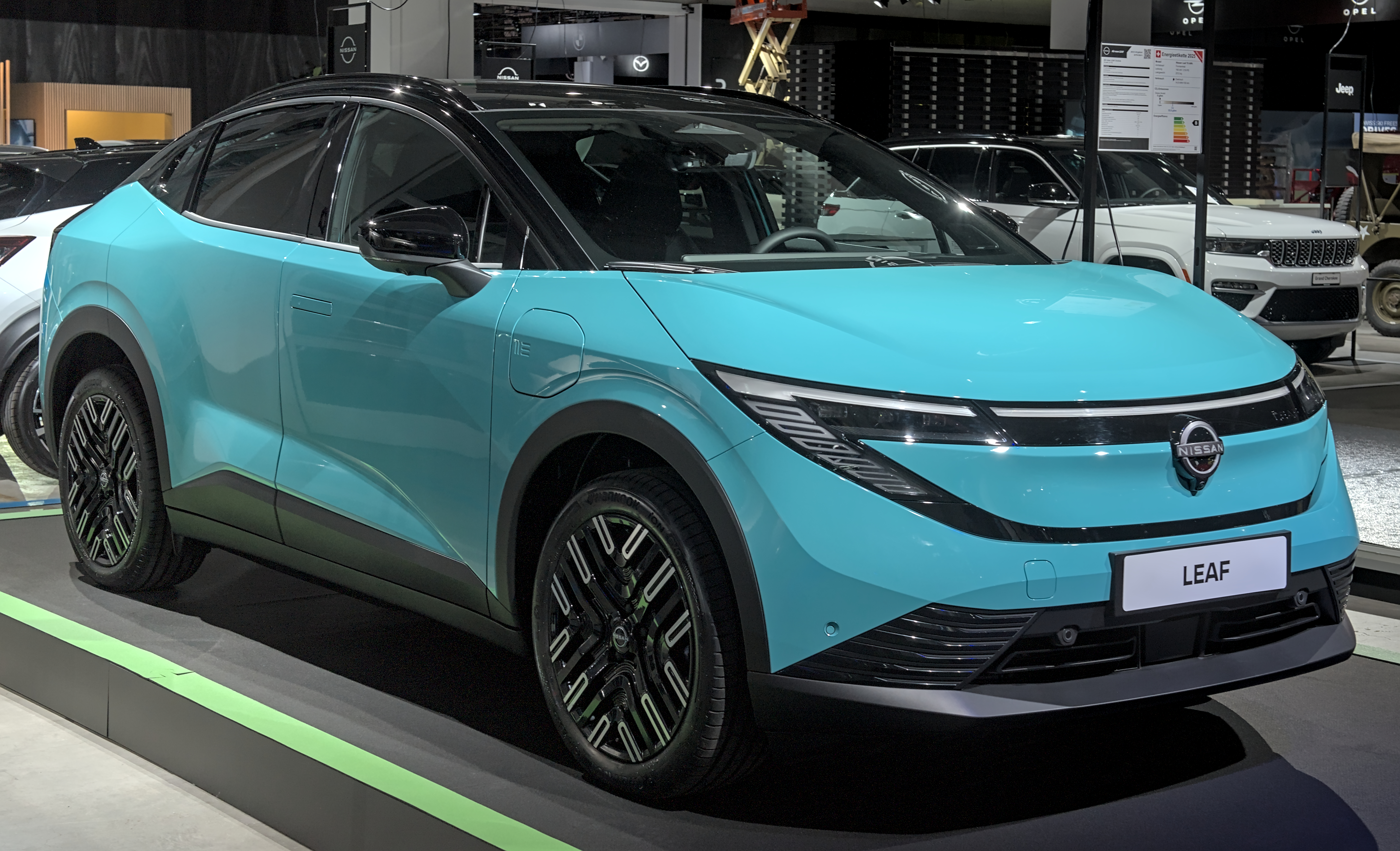

Overview
- Model code: ZE2
- Also called: Mitsubishi Eclipse Sportback (North America)
- Production: June 2025 – present
- Model years: 2026–present
- Assembly: Japan: Kaminokawa, Tochigi (Tochigi Plant); United Kingdom: Sunderland (NMUK)

Body and chassis
- Layout: Front-motor, front-wheel-drive
- Platform: AmpR Medium
- Related: Nissan Ariya; Nissan Juke (F17)

Powertrain
- Electric motor: 1×YM52 AC permanent magnet synchronous
- Power output: 130–160 kW (174–215 hp; 177–218 PS)
- Transmission: 1-speed planetary gear
- Battery: 52 kWh NMC; 75 kWh NMC AESC
- Electric range: 417–488 km (259–303 miles) (EPA); 436–604 km (271–375 miles) (WLTP)
- Plug-in charging: DC: 150 kW CHAdeMO & J1772 (Japan); NACS & J1772 (North America); CCS2 (Europe)

Dimensions
- Wheelbase: 2,690 mm (105.9 in)
- Length: 4,360 mm (171.7 in); 4,405 mm (173.4 in) (North America)
- Width: 1,810 mm (71.3 in)
- Height: 1,550–1,565 mm (61.0–61.6 in)
- Kerb weight: 1,750–1,920 kg (3,858.1–4,232.9 lb)

The third-generation Leaf was previewed as the Nissan Chill-Out concept on 29 November 2021. Nissan began to release details of the third-generation Leaf in March 2025. It was unveiled on 17 June 2025, with substantial updates to its design, platform, and performance. The model was released later that year. Departing from its previous hatchback form, the new Leaf adopted a subcompact crossover-style body built on the AmpR Medium (previously known as CMF-EV) platform, shared with the larger Nissan Ariya compact crossover. Significantly, the new Leaf is equipped with active liquid-cooled battery packs for the first time, rather than the passive air-cooled packs used in previous versions. The new Leaf retains a single-motor, front-wheel-drive layout but does not offer dual-motor, all-wheel-drive unlike the Ariya. Availability has been confirmed for North America, Europe, Japan, and Australia.

Nissan has stated that the vehicle offers "significant range improvements," with an estimated driving range of 490 km (303 miles) (EPA) on select configurations—compared to the previous model’s EPA-rated range of 240 to 341 km (149 to 212 miles). Nissan claims the European version has a range of 211 miles (340 km) at a steady speed of 129 km/h (80 mph). The Leaf also supports a faster charging rate of 150 kW and is the first Nissan vehicle to adopt the North American Charging System (NACS), making it compatible with the Tesla Supercharger network. In North America, the driver's side front wing contains a J1772 port (without CCS) for up to Level 2 charging, while the NACS port is located on the passenger side front wing. In North America, Nissan claims the battery can charge from 10–80% in 35 minutes when DC fast charging, or about 30 minutes for the European version. It has a lower Cd=0.25 (0.26 in North America) compared to the previous generation's 0.29.

Two liquid-cooled NMC lithium-ion battery options are available, both of which offer thermal conditioning functionality. The 52 kWh battery is paired with a motor outputting 130 kW (174 hp) and 344 N⋅m (254 lb⋅ft) of torque. The 75 kWh battery is paired with a 160 kW (214 hp) motor with 354 N⋅m (261 lb⋅ft) of torque.

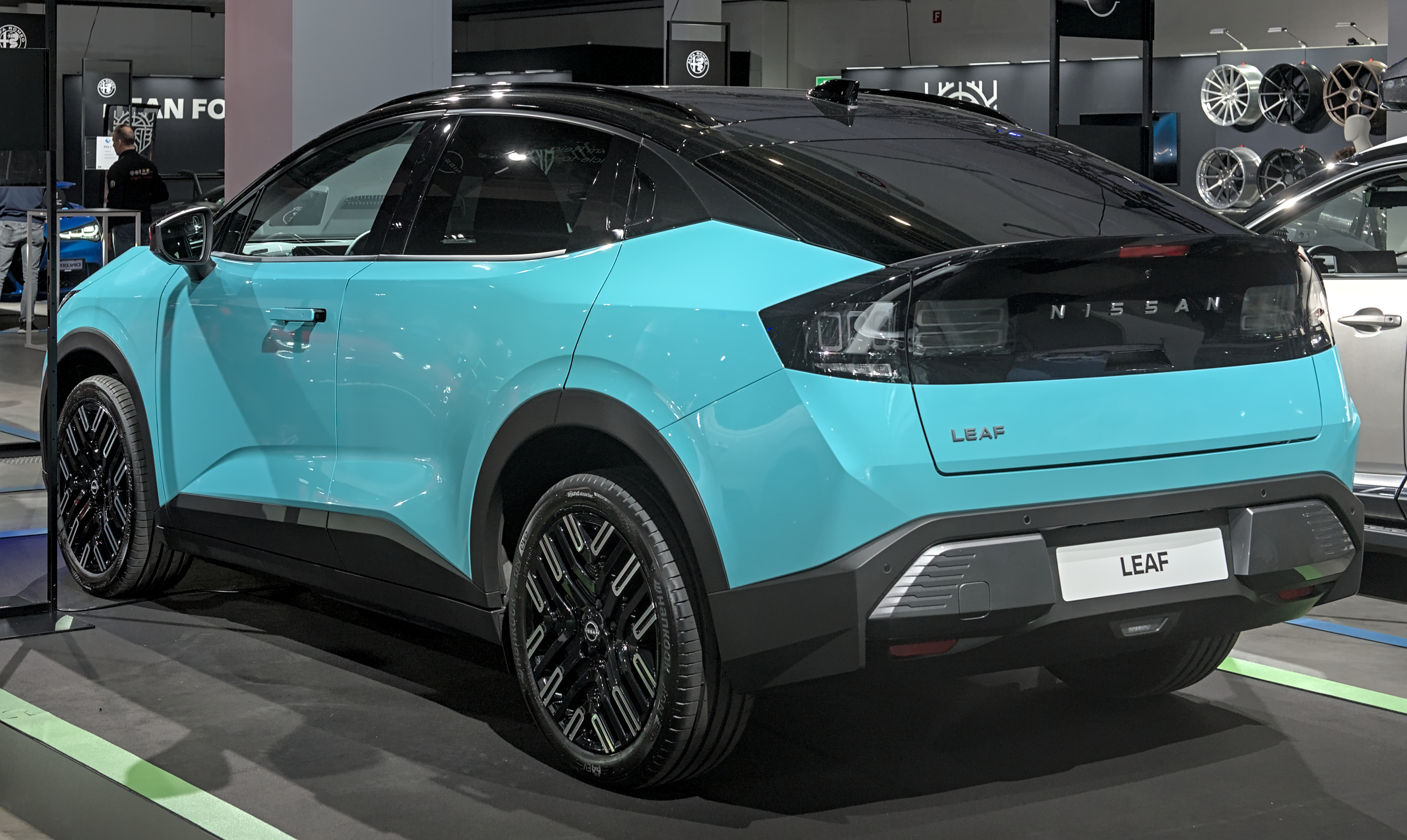
Rear view

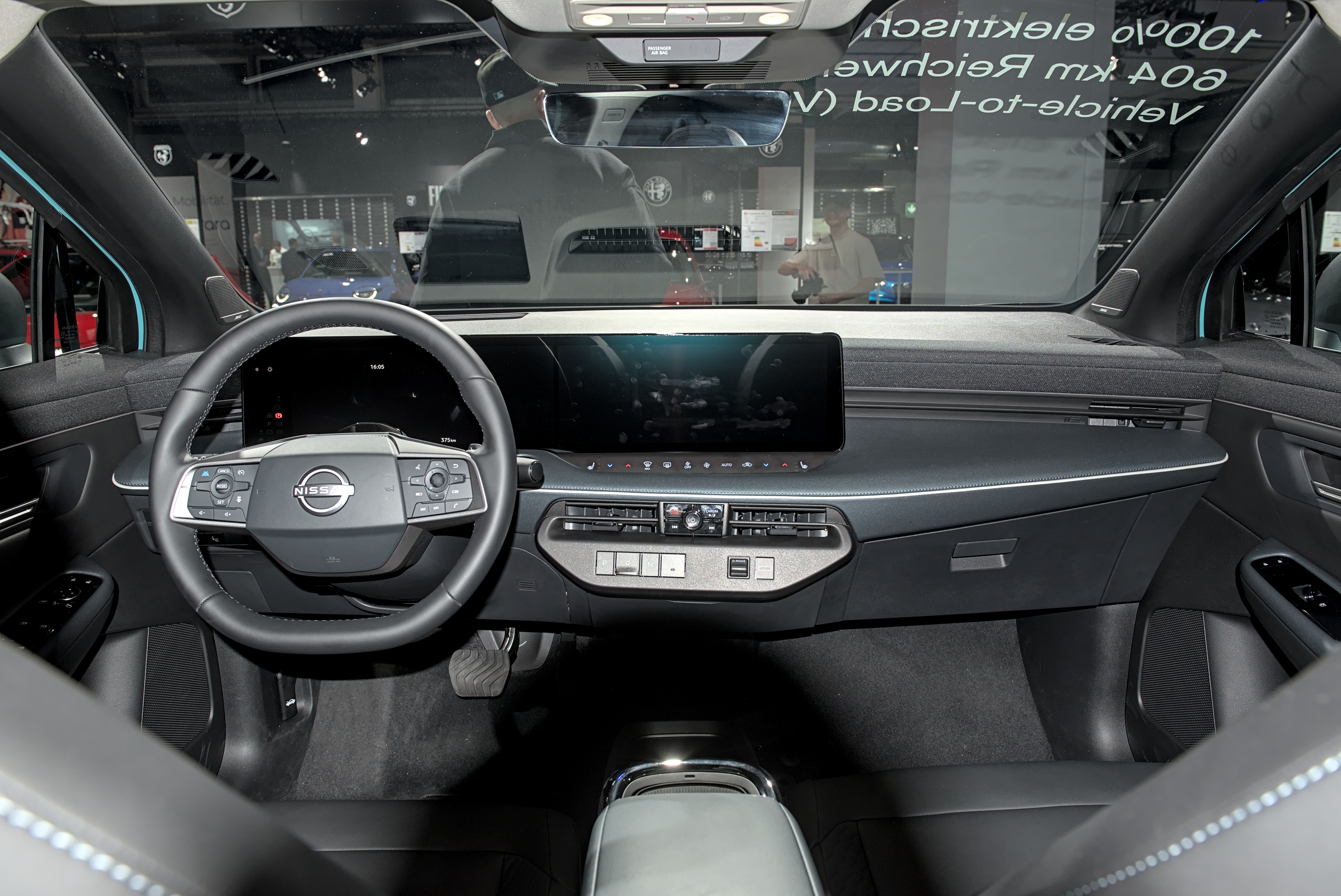
Interior

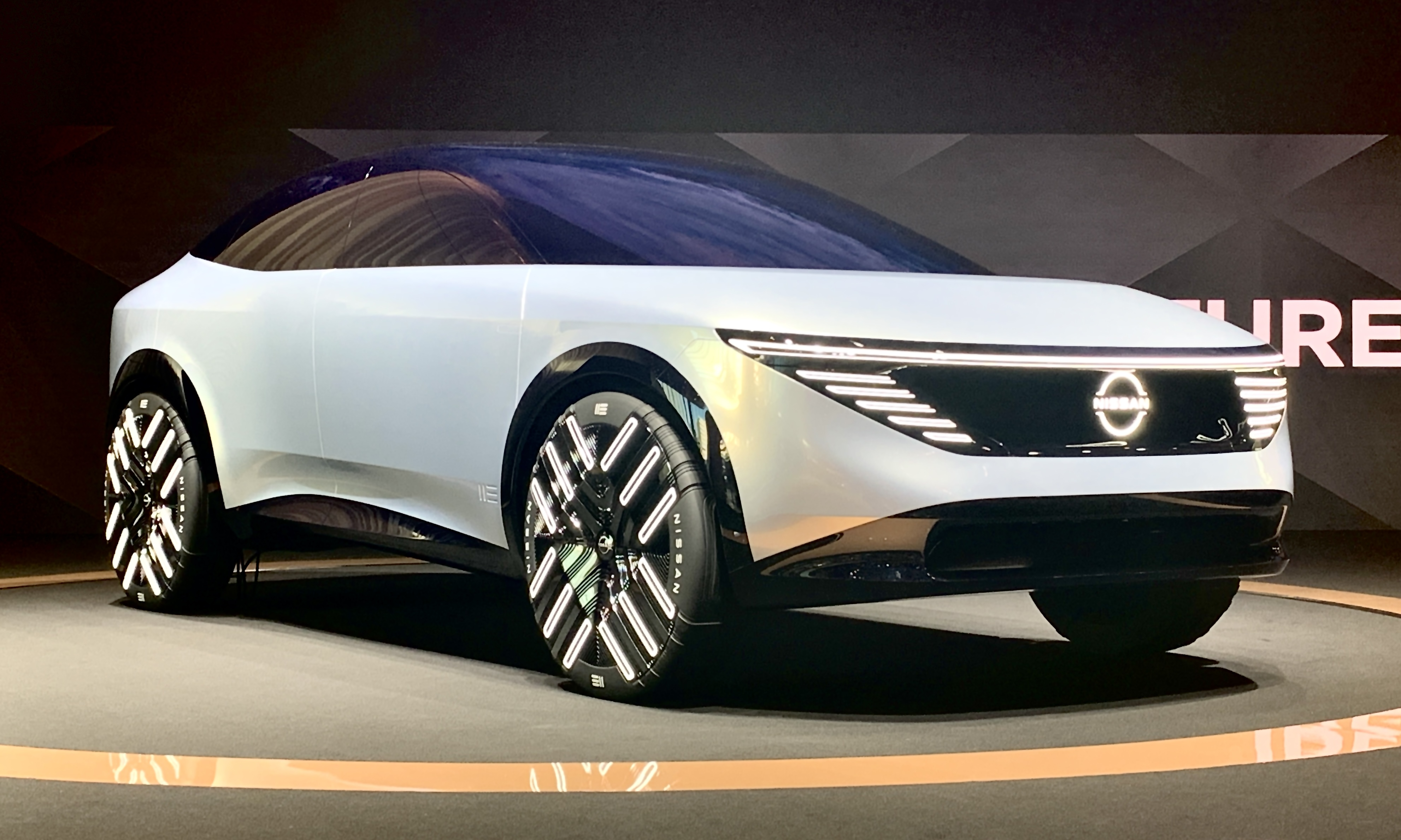
Nissan Chill-Out Concept, previewed the third generation Leaf

=== Mitsubishi Eclipse Sportback ===
The Mitsubishi Eclipse Sportback was unveiled on 9 June 2026 in North America. The Eclipse Sportback is based on the Nissan Leaf, but with a slightly different front fascia.

Sales will begin in the fall of the same year.

=== Leaf NISMO ===
Exclusive to the Japanese market, the Nismo trim level was added in July 2026. It was offered in both the B5 and B7 variants. The Leaf Nismo has unique wheels, stiffer suspension, and new aerodynamic aids. The Recaro seat option is available on the B7 grade. The electric motors are tuned for acceleration, but maximum power was not increased.

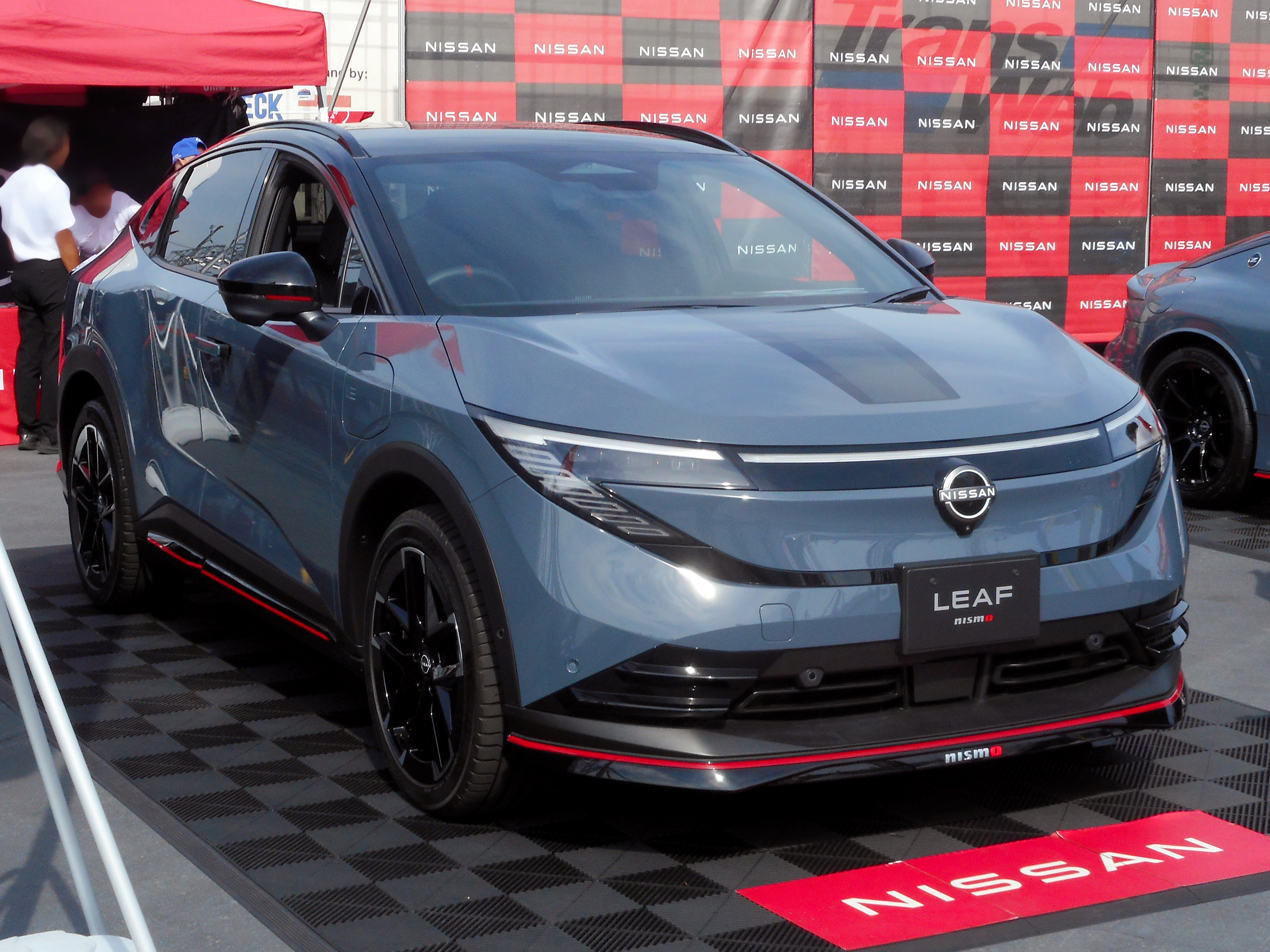
Nissan Leaf Nismo B7

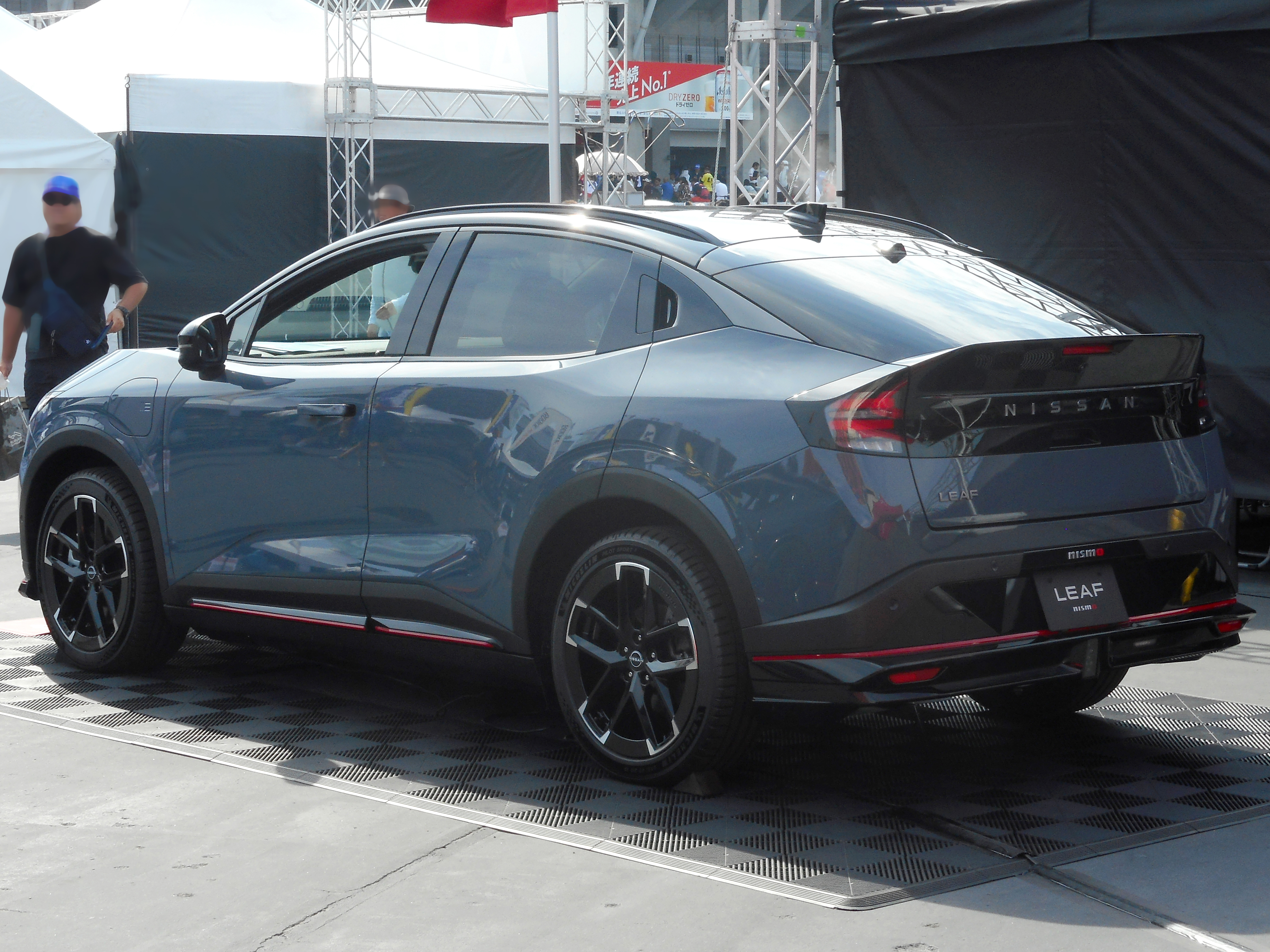
Rear view

== Global sales ==
The production version was unveiled in August 2009. After receiving 20,000 pre-orders in the United States, Nissan stopped taking reservations in the United States until early 2011. Production in Japan started in October 2010, and delivery in the US and Japan began in December, with deliveries in other markets beginning in early 2012. By December 2020 the Leaf was sold in 59 markets around the world.

The Leaf was the world's best selling electric car from 2011 to 2014 and 2016. Sales fell in 2015 with overall sales led by the Tesla Model S. As of December 2019, the Leaf listed as the world's all-time best selling plug-in electric car. By early 2020, the Tesla Model 3 surpassed the Leaf to become the new best selling electric car in history.

By February 2022, global Leaf deliveries totaled 577,000 cars. As of September 2021, Europe was listed as the biggest market with more than 208,000 units sold, of which 72,620 units had been registered in Norway, the leading European national market. As of December 2021, U.S. sales totaled 165,710 units through December 2021, and 157,059 units in Japan.

Sales by market (2010–2024)
Country	Total	2025	2024	2023	2022	2021	2020	2019	2018	2017	2016	2015	2014	2013	2012	2011	2010
US	201,256	5,149	11,226	7,152	12,026	14,237	9,559	12,365	14,715	11,230	14,006	17,269	30,200	22,610	9,819	9,674	19
Japan	185,026		5,211	10,026	12,732	10,843	11,286	19,789	25,722	16,925	14,793	9,057	14,177	13,021	11,115	10,310	19
UK	64,830			5,263	9,207	9,069	8,233	5,283	5,416	5,463	4,463	5,236	4,051	1,812	699	635	
Norway	59,046		1,608	2,471	3,222	5,313	5,221	6,127	12,303	3,374	4,162	3,189	4,781	4,604	2,298	373	
France	31,178			1,324	2,410	3,529	3,395	3,739	4,668	2,381	3,887	2,200	1,600	1,438	524	83	
Germany	24,154			1,995	3,593	5,051	3,597	2,620	2,380	841	1,121	831	812	855	451	7	
Canada	22,696	595	1,664	2,002	1,542	1,223	1,535	2,881	5,735	946	1,375	1,233	1,085	470	240	170	
Sweden	17,938			2,269	3,850	3,090	1,815	1,541	1,831	981	836	841	438	317	129		
China	4,170 (Note: Chinese sales correspond to the rebadged Venucia e30.)									4	2,095	1,273	582	216			
Netherlands	14,672			561	907	1,214	1,632	3,817	3,384	513	666	447	510	462	265	294	
Spain	7,133			238	379	705	885	1,509	1,258	530	344	344	465	263	154	59	
Italy	2,103									448	460	389	332	323	146	5	
Denmark	1,202									20	85	224	577	211	73	12	
Ireland	1,366									258	352	405	192	43	69	45	2
Belgium	1,510									389	466	162	178	141	114	60	
Austria	1,149									384	333	156	121	88	64	3	
Australia	2,685			484	331	367	370			384	156	136	173	188	77	19	
Switzerland	2,967			92	143	395	542	536	428	131	158	145	106	178	74	39	
Total top markets	645,081	5,744	19,709	33,877	50,342	55,036	48,070	60,207	77,840	45,202	49,758	43,537	60,380	47,240	26,311	21,788	40
Total global sales	303,678									~47,000	49,245	43,651	61,507	47,716	26,973	22,094	50

== See also ==
- Canto sound
- Electric car use by country
- List of best-selling automobiles
- List of production battery electric vehicles
- Revenge of the Electric Car: 2011 American film documenting how the electric car was brought to world markets.
- Zero-emissions vehicle: a vehicle that emits no exhaust gas from the onboard source of power.
