= Bortolotto =

Bortolotto is an Italian surname. Notable people with the surname include:

- Claudio Bortolotto (born 1952), Italian cyclist
- Mario Bortolotto (1957–2022), Australian rules footballer
- Roberto Bortolotto (athlete) (born 1967), Brazilian sprinter
- Roberto Bortolotto (born 1984), Italian footballer

== See also ==
- Bortolotti
