= Yongwoo Lee =

South Korean art historian

Yongwoo Lee is a South Korean art historian and curator based in Shanghai and Seoul. He is currently a professor at Tongji University and was previously the artistic director of the Shanghai International Art City Research Institute and a professor at the Academy of Fine Arts of Shanghai University.

He is the founder and co-curator of the Shanghai Project with Hans Ulrich Obrist and was previously the director of the Shanghai Himalayas Museum. He was the first president of the International Biennial Association, from 2013 to 2017.

== Education ==
Lee studied literature and art history at Yonsei University, as well as Hongik University, in Seoul. He has a Ph.D. in art history from Oxford University, where his doctoral dissertation, The Origins of Video Art, critically examined encounters between art and technology.

== Career ==
=== Gwangju Biennale ===
Lee was the founding director of the Gwangju Biennale in 1995, the first international bienniale in East Asia, which took "Beyond the Borders" as its inaugural theme. The first Gwangju Biennale was visited by 1.63 million spectators, which remains the largest audience in the history of biennales. Lee was once again invited to curate the 2004 Gwangju Biennale for its tenth anniversary and also served as president of the Gwangju Biennale Foundation from 2008 to 2014.

=== Shanghai Project ===
Lee founded the Shanghai Project in 2015 when he was the executive director of Shanghai Himalayas Museum, and co-curated its 2016 and 2017 editions with Hans Ulrich Obrist. The Shanghai Project aimed to create an idea platform bringing together practitioners from a variety of disciplines, including art, architecture, design, film, performance, and sound, as well as the humanities and social and natural sciences. The project explored the future of human beings in 100 years, with the theme "2116", focusing on climate change, human extinction, virtual reality, and slow-aging.

=== SIAC (Shanghai International Art City) Research Institute ===
Lee is the artistic director of the Shanghai International Art City Research Institute, which was established in 2017 by Baowu Steel and the Shanghai Academy of Fine Arts (SAFA), Shanghai University. SIAC is a long-term project that transforms the decommissioned industrial heritage of the Baowu Steel compound into an art city. The planned art facilities include museums, arts streets, studios, galleries, art and architecture colleges, residential spaces, theaters, and other cultural facilities. The Shanghai International Art City Research Institute is located within Shanghai University and has the function of a research program as well as the mission to intervene in various spaces attached to art cities.

== Exhibitions ==
Lee has curated biennales as well as solo and thematic group shows, including two editions of the Gwangju Biennale in 1995 and 2004, "Information and Reality" (Contemporary Art of Korea, Fruitmarket Gallery, Edinburgh), "Whitney Biennial in Seoul" (National Museum of Contemporary Art, Seoul), "Nam June Paik Retrospective" (National Museum of Contemporary Art, Seoul), "The Flower of May" (The 30th Anniversary Exhibition of the Gwangju Civil Uprising, hosted by the Gwangju Biennale Foundation and Gwangju Museum of Art), "Dansaekhwa" (Palazzo Contarini Polignac, Collateral Event of the 56th Venice Biennale), "Tiger's Tail" (Palazzo Vendramin, Venice), "International Film and Video Since the 1980s" (Shanghai Himalayas Museum), and "The Challenging Souls: Yves Klein, Lee Ufan, Ding Yi" at the Power Station of Art (PSA), Shanghai, co-curated with Gong Yan.

Lee was a member of the international jury that selected Armenia as recipient of the Golden Lion for best national participation at the 56th Venice Biennale, in 2015.

== Publications ==
- Dansaekhwa (editor)
- Information and Reality (Fruitmarket Gallery Edinburgh)
- Nam June Paik (Samsung Publication)
- The Origins of Video Art (Munyemadang – doctoral dissertation)
- Art and Life of Nam June Paik (Yeoleumsa)
