= Bertolotti =

Bertolotti is an Italian surname. Notable people with the surname include:

- Alessandro Bertolotti (born 1960), Italian writer and photographer
- Andrés Bertolotti (born 1943), Argentine footballer
- Bernardino Bertolotti, 16th-century Italian composer and musician
- Brittany Murphy (1977–2009), American actress born as Brittany Bertolotti
- Cesare Bertolotti (1854–1932), Italian painter
- Gasparo Bertolotti known as Gasparo da Salò Italian luthier
- Gianni Bertolotti (born 1950), Italian basketball player
- Giovanni Lorenzo Bertolotti (1640–1721), Italian Baroque painter
- Mariano Bertolotti (born 1982), Argentine judoka

== See also ==
- Bertolotti's syndrome, back pain
