= Shanghai Himalayas Museum =

- 上海喜玛拉雅美术馆
- Former name: Shanghai Zendai MoMA
- Location: Pudong, Shanghai, China
- Type: Private art museum
- Director: Yongwoo Lee
- Architect: Arata Isozaki
- Website: www.himalayasmuseum.org

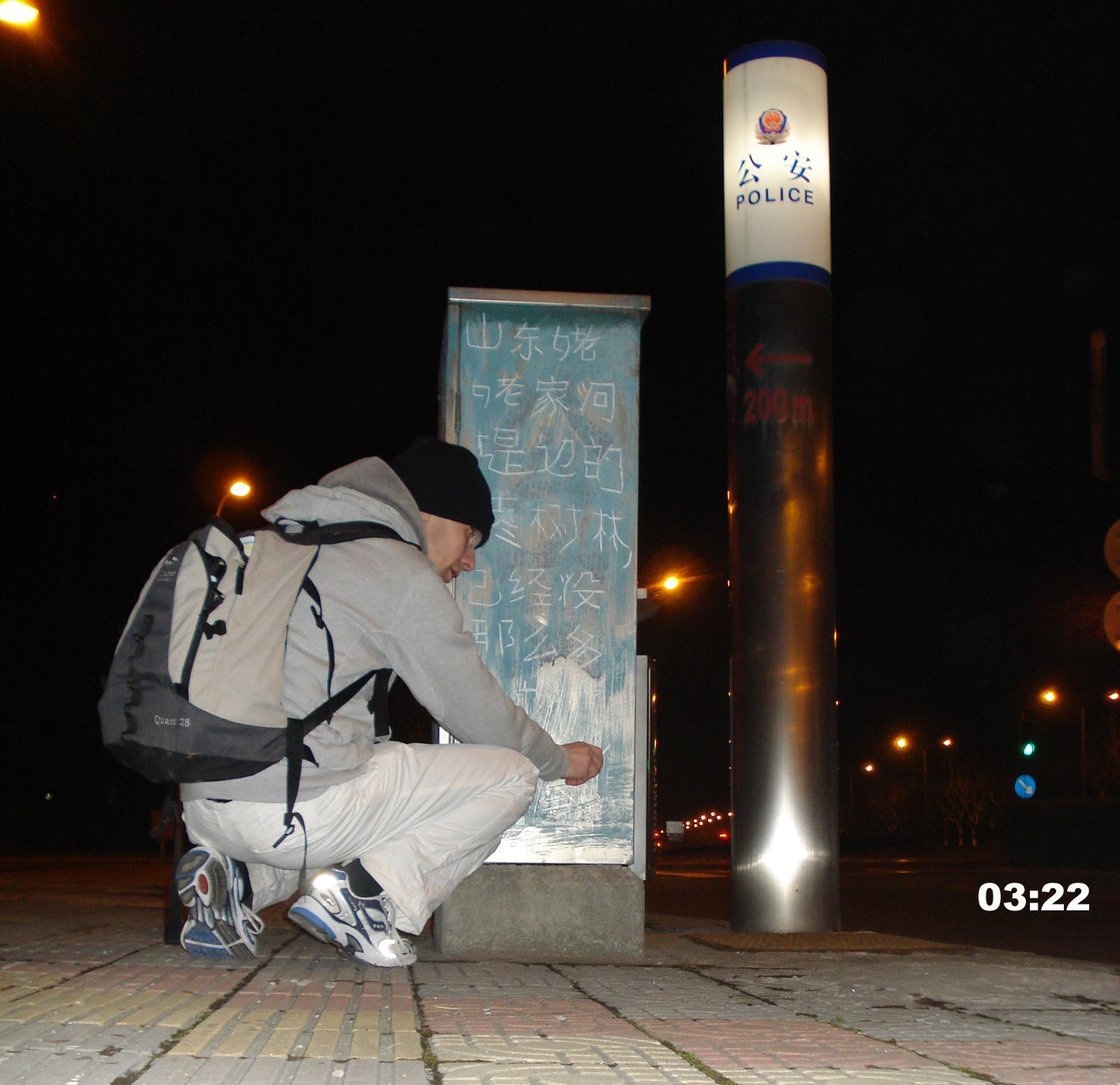
Filling the City with Dreams (2008), performance art, Shanghai Zendai MoMA

Shanghai Himalayas Museum (Chinese: 上海喜玛拉雅美术馆), formerly known as Shanghai Zendai MoMA (上海证大现代艺术馆), was a privately funded, non-profit art institute in Pudong, Shanghai, China, focusing on art exhibition, education, collection, research and academic exchanges, established by the Shanghai Zendai Group in 2005. Shanghai Himalayas Museum is the main organizer of the inaugural edition of the Shanghai Project, a yearlong ideas platform co-directed by Yongwoo Lee and Hans-Ulrich Obrist. The museum has been inactive since January 2025.

== Museum ==
Located at the Himalayas Center, a landmark in Shanghai designed by Arata Isozaki, the new site of the museum was opened to public in 2012.

Other than the main space in Pudong, the museum also has two branch spaces. Zendai Contemporary Art Space is located at Wuwei Creative Park in northeast Shanghai. Covering an area of 2,000sqm, the space consists of galleries and artist studios, and focuses on the study and exploration of experimental and avant-garde art. Zendai Zhujiajiao Art Museum is located at Zhujiajiao town, a picturesque water-town suburb southeast of central Shanghai. Covering an area of 400sqm, the two-storey art museum consists of en-suite artist studios, galleries and a conference room. The space runs an artist-in-residence programme and organizes a variety of public art programmes targeting at local community.

== Exhibitions ==
Since 2011, the museum has presented a series of international art projects including “Designing Design / The Exhibition of Kenya Hara in China 2011”, “Tony Cragg: Sculptures and Drawings”, Ink Art Exhibition Series, “Ateliers – Ofer Lellouche Solo Exhibition”, 2014 John Moores Painting Prize (China) Exhibition, solo exhibitions of Sean Scully and Michael Craig-Martin, and "Welcome to My Life - Moving Image from the Collection of Isabelle and Jean-Conrad Lemaître".
