= Envision Energy =

Chinese wind turbine company

Envision
- Type: Private
- Industry: energy industry
- Founded: 2007
- Founder: Lei Zhang
- Headquarters: Shanghai, China
- Products: Wind turbines， energy management software
- Website: www.envision-energy.com

Envision Energy (Chinese: 远景能源) is a Chinese green technology company, founded by Lei Zhang and headquartered in Shanghai. Envision is a global leader in wind turbines, energy storage, and green hydrogen solutions. It acquired AESC, Nissan's battery subsidiary, in 2018 and has owned the Envision Racing Formula E team since 2022. It was named to Fortune's Change the World list in 2021, 2024, and 2026, and to Time magazine's 2024 list of the 100 Most Influential Companies.

== History ==
Envision was founded by Lei Zhang in 2007 in Jiangyin, Jiangsu in eastern China. The company started full operations in 2009.

In 2013, Envision installed five 2.1 MW, 110-metre-rotor turbines at the Ucuquer wind farm in central Chile. It also signed software contracts with US developer Pattern Energy's fleet and compatriot Atlantic Power's Canadian Hills wind farm in Oklahoma.

In 2014, Envision is partnering with New Zealand's infrastructure fund manager Infratil to build smart infrastructure in Christchurch, New Zealand. Zhang was named among the Top 10 Chinese innovators in 2014 by China Daily.

In 2015, Envision launched its office in London to handle business in Europe, the Middle East, and Africa. Its entry into the European market was the purchase of a 25MW onshore project near Eskilstuna, Sweden. It also acquired ViveEnergia's 600 MW wind energy projects in Mexico in the same year.

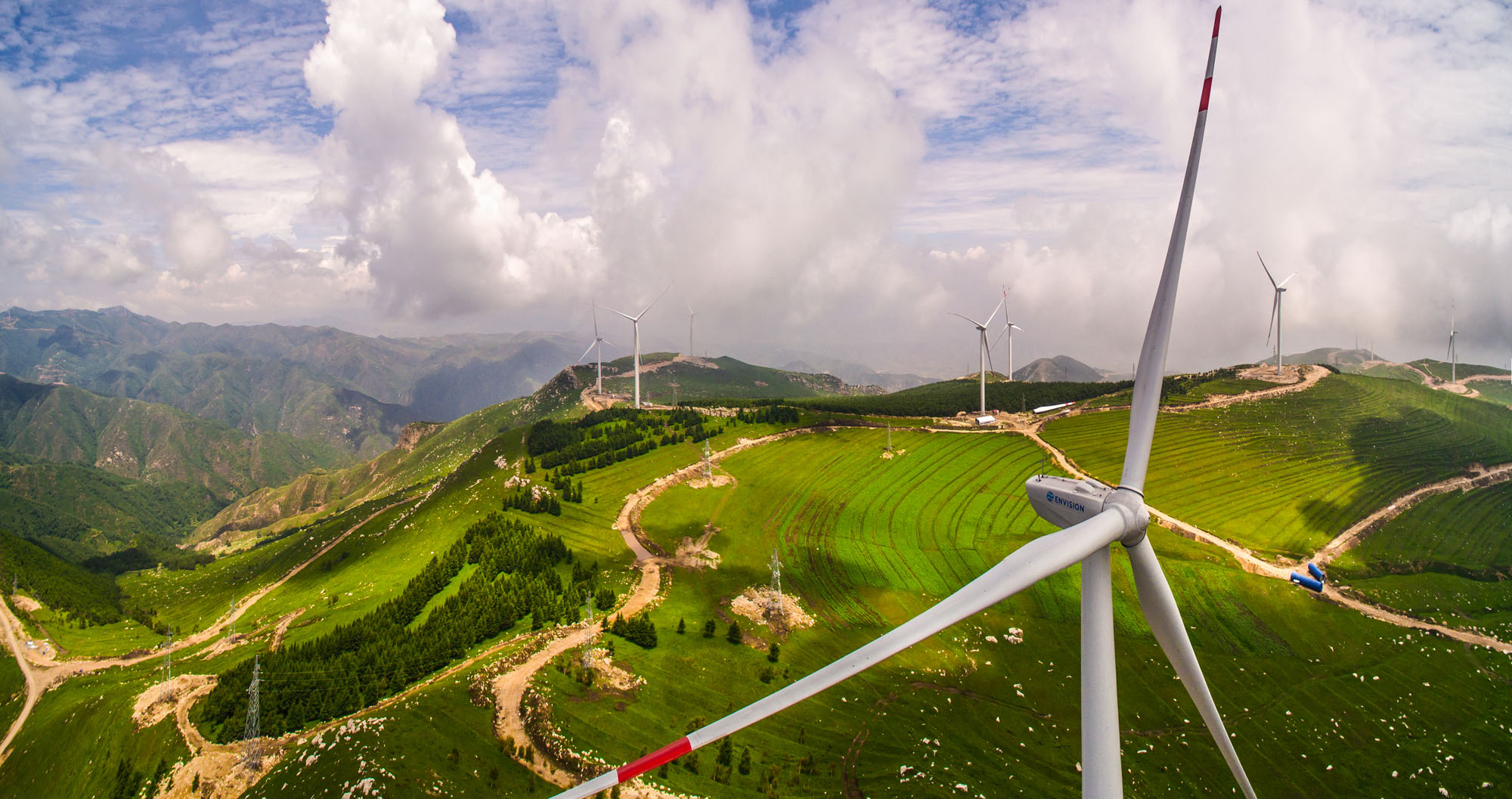
Panorama of Envision's wind farm in Shanxi, China

In early 2016, Envision launched a new operational head office in Hamburg, Germany, which provides service to its international clients in European countries, and a Global Blade Innovation Center in Boulder, Colorado, which will lead the R&D of blade design in the US. Envision's Ucuquer wind farm project in Chile has been selected as finalist in Inter-American Development Bank's 360 2016 Infrastructure Awards. The company also made a new investment in a renewable energy project in Montenegro along with Enemalta, Shanghai Electric Power, and Vestigo. Currently, Envision is in the process of installing 5 more wind turbines in La Esperanza Wind Farm in Negrete Municipality, Chile by the end of March 2016.

In 2018, Envision bought a majority stake of the AESC battery unit from Nissan in a deal involving also NEC and its Energy Devices division, forming Envision AESC. The headquarters and development centers were promised to remain in Japan. Involved in the deal were battery manufacturing operations in Smyrna, Tennessee and Sunderland.

In 2022, Envision signed a partnership agreement with Spain on four projects including an EV battery plant in Navalmoral de la Mata, which should have been partly paid for by government funds. Later that year the gigafactory plant was left out of public aid from the Ministry of Industriy, Commerce and Tourism entirely. Envision Energy decided to forge ahead anyway. Further projects include a renewable hydrogen plant in Alcazar de San Juan and a wind energy park with turbine assembly plant in Navas del Marques. The fourth project is a digital products development center.

The National Defense Authorization Act for Fiscal Year 2024 proposed the prohibition of US defense funding for Envision batteries on security grounds.

== Operations ==
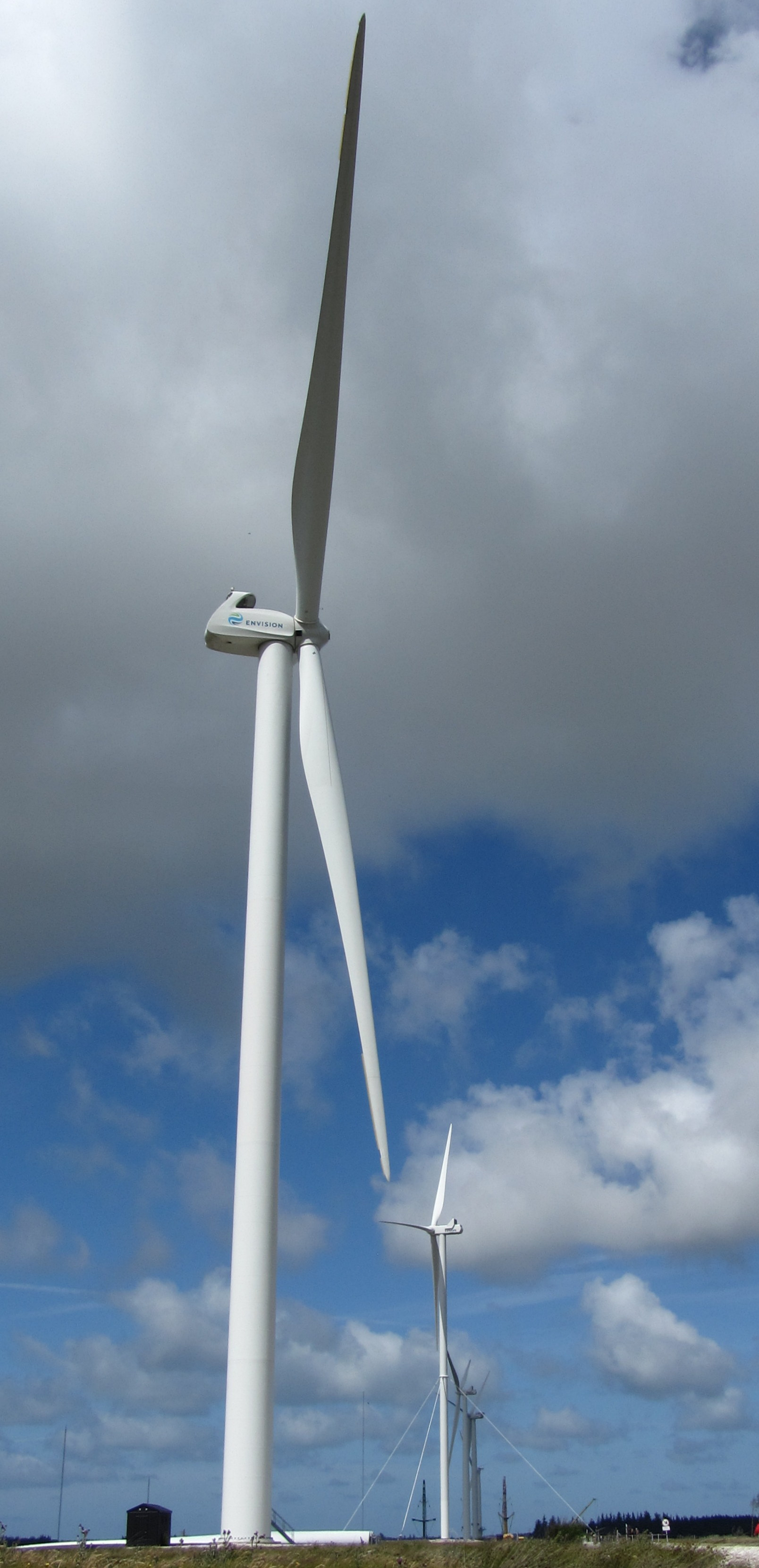
Envision 3MW at Østerild, 2017

Envision's wind R&D operations are based in its headquarters in Shanghai, in a factory complex in Jiangyin, and in an innovation center in Silkeborg, Denmark, staffed by 40 engineers focusing on advanced turbine technology. There is a battery-storage R&D center in Osaka, Japan, a cloud service center in Houston, and a digital innovation center in Silicon Valley, California. In 2022, Envision opened its first green hydrogen R&D center in Boston. The company has installed over 30 Gw.h (108 TJ) of wind capacity worldwide.

In 2023, Envision was ranked second among the top wind turbine suppliers in the world.
