= Automotive Energy Supply Corporation =

Manufacturer of lithium based batteries for electric vehicles

Automotive Energy Supply Corporation (AESC)
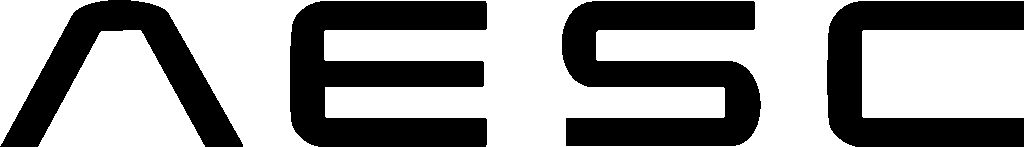
- Industry: Electric vehicle battery
- Founded: 2007
- Headquarters: Yokohama, Japan
- Products: Lithium-ion batteries
- Owner: Envision, Nissan
- Website: www.aesc-group.com

Automotive Energy Supply Corporation (AESC) is a manufacturer of lithium-ion batteries for electric vehicles. It was established in 2007 as a joint venture between Nissan and Tokin Corporation. China's Envision became a joint venture partner in 2018.

== History ==
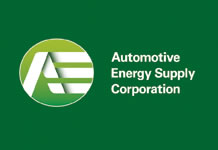
Previous AESC Logo

In 2007, NEC Corporation, Nissan Motor Company, and NEC Tokin agreed to establish a lithium-ion battery company for electric vehicles, focused on development to production. In 2008, led by Andy Palmer, the company was established with a capital of ¥1.5 billion ($14.3 million) with a Nissan, NEC, and NEC TOKIN holding shares of 51:42:7 respectively. The aim was to establish a manufacturing facility at Nissan's site in Zama, Kanagawa (c.2009) with an initial capacity of 13,000 units per year. The eventual annual goal was 65,000 units through an investment of ¥12 billion ($114.6 million). The plant was to be supplied with lithium manganese electrode from NEC TOKIN's factory in Sagamihara, Kanagawa, which would be upgraded at a cost of ¥11 billion ($128 million). The intended markets were forklift trucks, which would be followed by electric and hybrid vehicles manufactured by Nissan.

Initial production of the Lithium Manganese Oxide battery (LiMn_{2}O_{4}) LMO was based on a manganese spinel cathode, with batteries formed from laminated cells. The battery (L3-10) was a 251 by 144.2 by 9.2 millimetres (9.88 in × 5.68 in × 0.36 in) unit of 13 Ah, 3.6 V with a power density of 2060 W/kg (2.5 V @ 20 °C).

In late 2008, the joint owners announced that they were investing a further ¥100 billion ($1.1 billion) in AESC, establishing an additional factory to increase capacity for around 200,000 vehicles per year. Trial production at Zama began in mid-2009.

In 2010, the Nissan Leaf began production, using batteries from AESC.

In 2014, AESC was the second largest electric vehicle battery manufacturer worldwide (after Panasonic), with 21% of the market. In late 2014, Reuters reported conflict within the alliance between Nissan and Renault over sourcing of battery packs for Nissan Motor Manufacturing UK and the Nissan Smyrna Assembly Plant due to lack of price competitiveness with rival cell manufacturer LG Chem. Nissan was reported to have signed contracts to take all of NEC's electrode production, irrespective of sales.

In 2016, Nissan, preferring external suppliers, decided to sell its 51% stake in AESC. In December 2016, Carlos Ghosn explained that being tied to in-house battery manufacturing did not allow for the flexibility of buying cheaper third-party batteries.

In mid-2017, Nissan announced that it would sell its battery businesses, including AESC (with its acquired 49% NEC stake), to Chinese investment company GSR Capital for approximately $1 billion. However, this sale was canceled in July 2018 after three delays as GSR Capital did not complete its funding.

In August 2018, Nissan announced the sale of its electric car battery unit to China's Envision Group, while retaining a 25% stake. The sale included AESC and its battery manufacturing plants in the United States (Tennessee) and England (Sunderland). NEC's 49% stake was sold to Envision.

In 2025, AESC halted construction of a battery manufacturing plant in South Carolina due to uncertainty regarding tariffs in the second Trump administration. The Smyrna plant also stopped production for Nissan in June and switched to energy storage. In April 2026, AESC sold its majority stake in its sole U.S. battery plant to Fixx Energy.

== Customers ==
- Nissan
- Renault

== Production sites ==
In April 2019, the company announced plans to open a new 20 GWh capacity battery plant in Jiangyin a town in the northern district of Wuxi, Jiangsu, China, roughly triple its production capacity of 7.5GWh. Another production site is in Inner Mongolia at the Ordos-Envision Net Zero Industrial Park. The park is claimed to be world's first zero-carbon industrial cluster for hydrogen, batteries, battery storage and further green technologies.

European activities include a new EV 9 GWh factory will be built in Sunderland, England. Construction is underway for Envision AESC Giga 1, which represents an initial 9 GWh plant. Potential future-phase investment of £1.8bn could generate up to 25 GWh capacity and create 4,500 new high-value green jobs in the region by 2030, with another option for up to 35 GWh. Renault and Envision AESC confirmed in June 2021 the plan to set up a €2 billion ($2.4 billion) gigafactory in Douai, Northern France close to Renault ElectriCity which would supply 9 GWh EV batteries by 2024 and 24 GWh of batteries by 2030.

In April 2022, Envision AESC also presented the project of a new power battery "super factory" in Kentucky, with a planned production capacity of 30 GWh which could be extended to 40 GWh.

=== Japan ===
- Zama plant
- Ibaraki plant
- Sagamihara electrod plant

=== China ===
- Jiangyin plant (Wuxi), Jiangsu
- Ordos plant, Inner Mongolia (SOP 2022, carbon Net zero)
- Shiyan plant, Hubei (SOP 2021)
- Cangzhou plant, Hebei (planned SOP 2024)

=== Europe ===
- Douai plant, France
- Extremadura plant, Spain
- Sunderland plant, Great Britain

=== USA ===
- Smyrna plant, Tennessee
- Florence plant, South Carolina (under construction 2024)
- Bowling Green plant, Kentucky (under construction 2024)

== Gallery ==
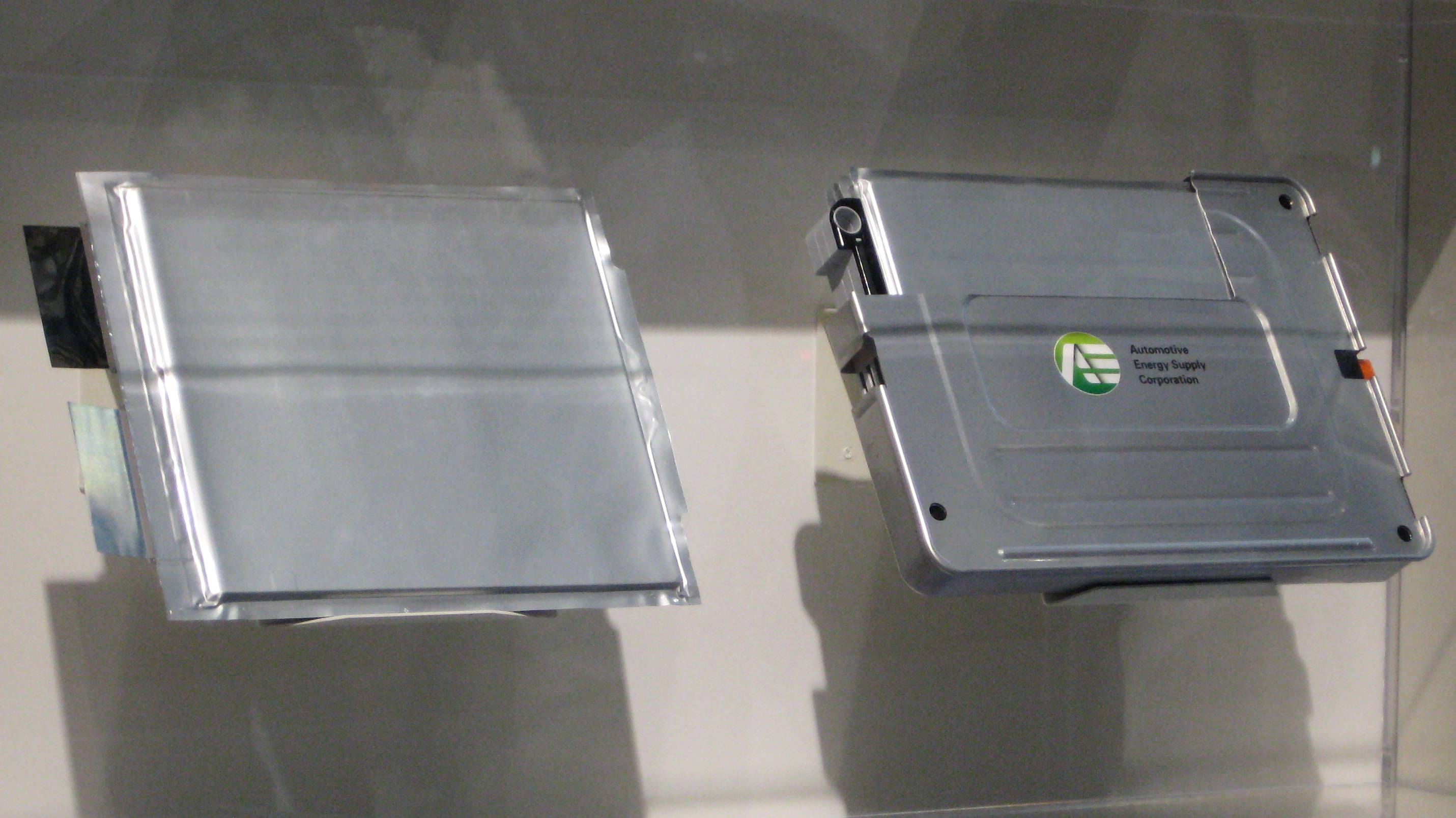
Individual cell (left) and packaged battery or "module" (right), Tokyo Motor Show (2009)

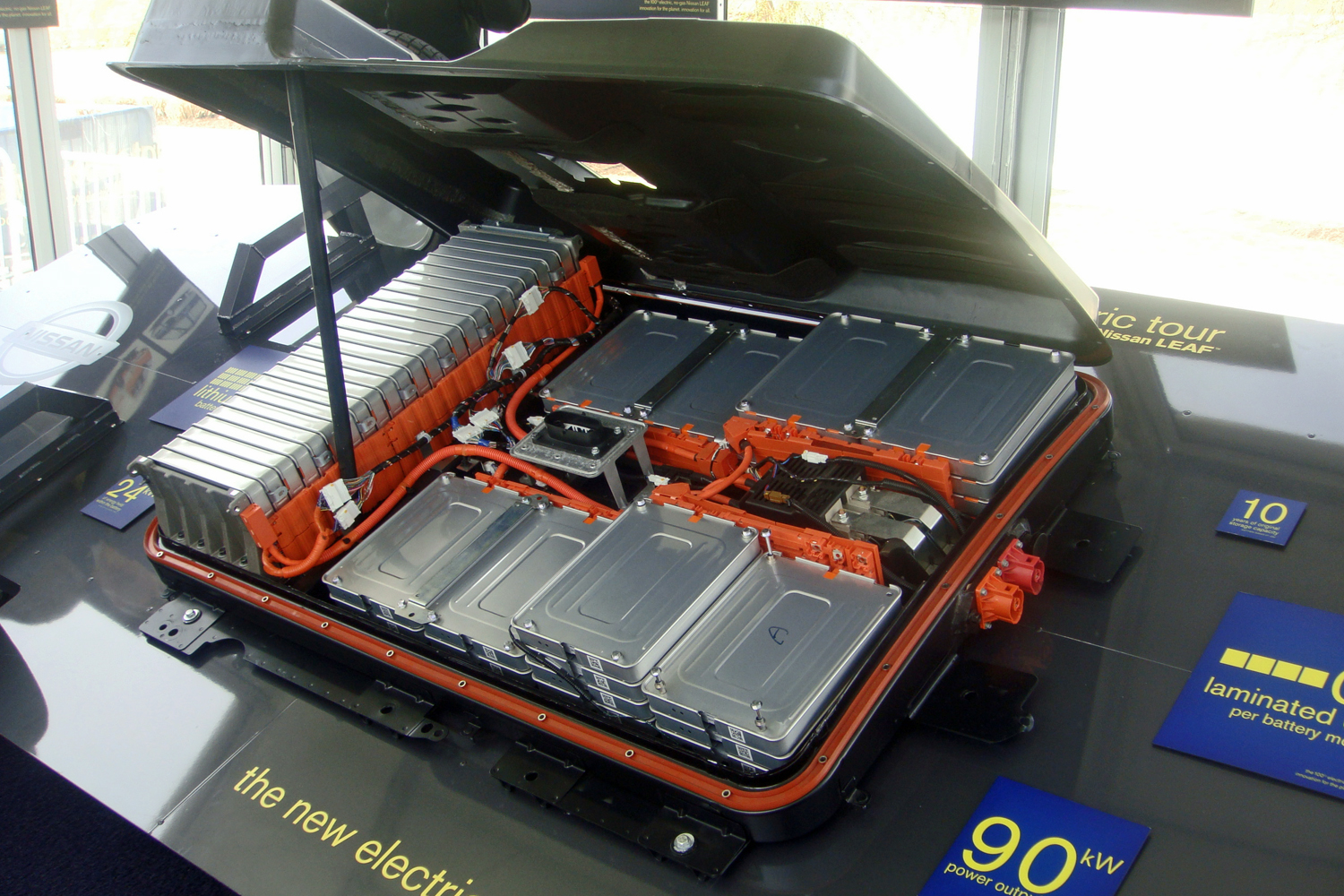
Battery pack (2011)
