= Timo Bortolotti =

Italian sculptor (1889–1954)

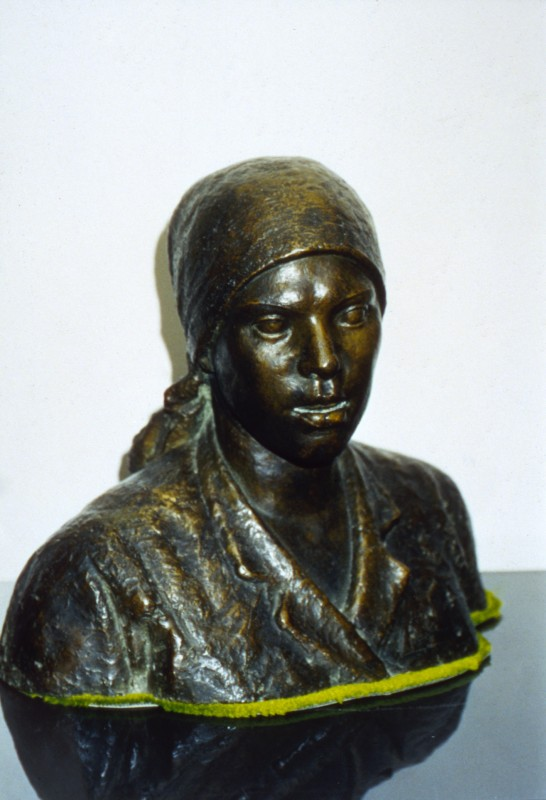
Mondina, 1936 (Art collections of Fondazione Cariplo)

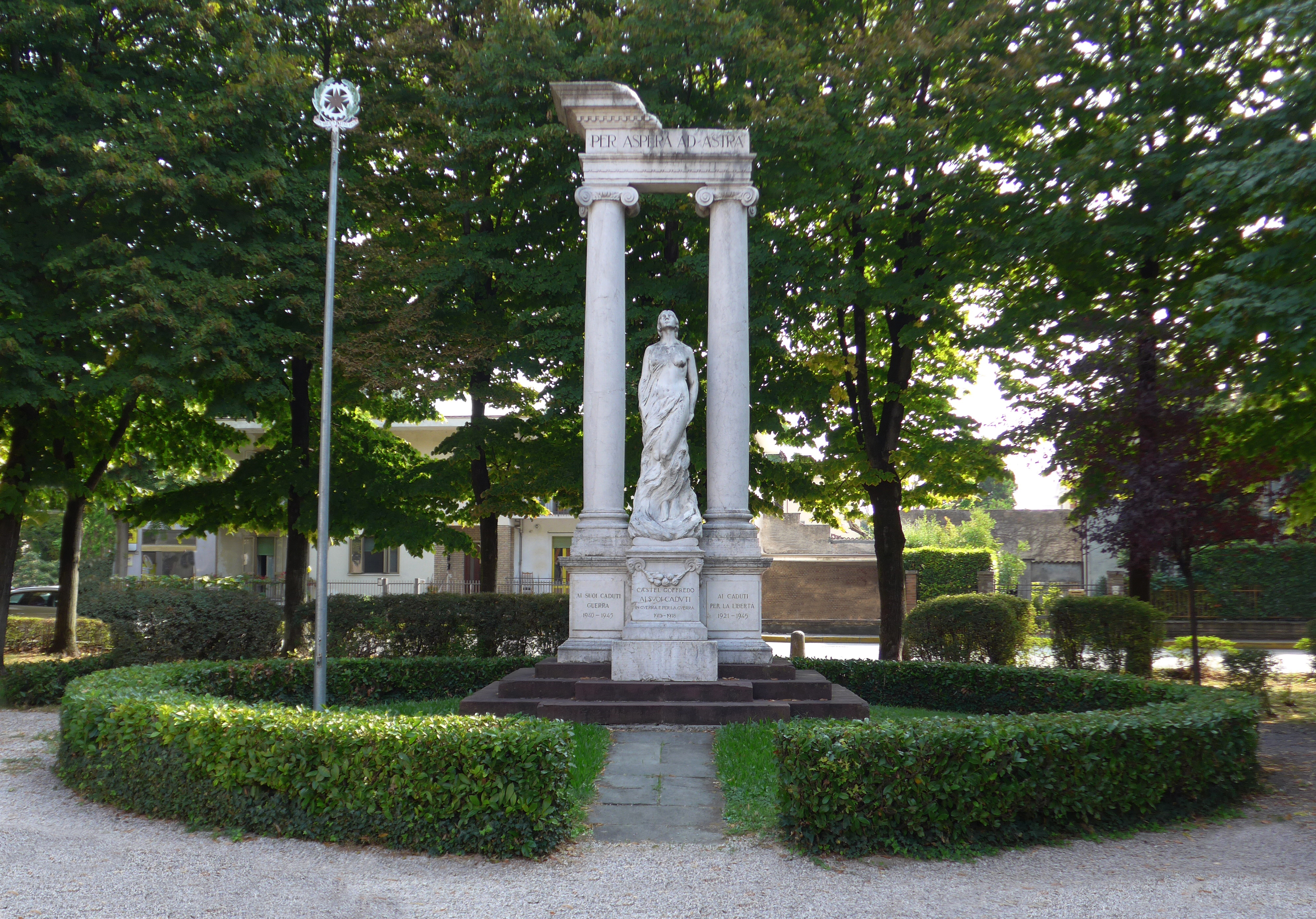
Castel Goffredo, war memorial

Timo Bortolotti (Darfo (Brescia), 1889 – Milan, 1954) was an Italian sculptor.

== Biography ==
Bortolotti attended the Brera Academy for a short period before leaving to serve in World War I, after which he established himself as a sculptor in Brescia and produced the monument to the fallen at Passo del Tonale (1923). He moved to Milan in 1924, and it was through contact with the Novecento Italiano movement that his initial realism turned towards an austere form of Classicism. His participation in the Venice Biennale began by invitation with the 17th Esposizione Internazionale d’Arte di Venezia in 1930, which led to an increase in the number of commissions for public works of art. The Galleria d’Arte Moderna, Milan, bought one of his works in 1932, and 1935 was a year of particular success. He was awarded the Savoia-Barbante Prize in Rome, held his first solo show at the Galleria Dedalo in Milan and took part in the second Rome Quadrenniale. He was awarded the first prize for foreign sculpture in Paris at the Exposition Internationale of 1937.

== Exhibition ==
- "Mostre d'arte in risaia", Mortara, 1936 and 1938, curator Carlo Ernesto Accetti.
- VII Sindacale, Milan, 1936
- Esposizione alla Zattera dell'Associazione nazionale marinai in congedo ai Navigli, Milao, 1936, curator Carlo Ernesto Accetti

== Other projects ==
Media related to Timo Bortolotti at Wikimedia Commons
