= Iván Espinosa =

Iván Espinosa may refer to:

- Iván Espinosa (businessman) (born 1978), Mexican businessman
- Iván Espinosa de los Monteros (born 1971), Spanish real estate developer and politician
