= Nissan Engine Museum =

Automobile museum in Yokohama, Japan

Coordinates: 35°28′54.5″N 139°39′43.9″E

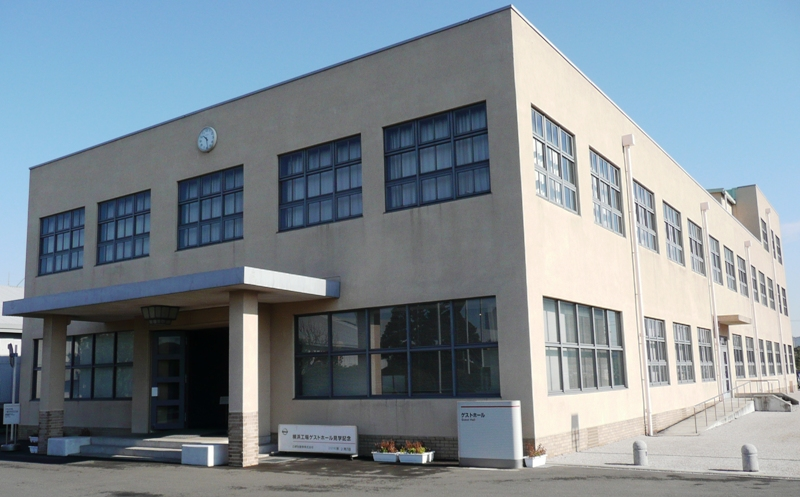
Nissan Engine Museum

The Nissan Engine Museum (日産エンジン博物館, Nissan Enjin Hakubutsukan) is an automobile engine museum run by Nissan Motor Company. The museum is located at the first floor of the guest hall in Yokohama auto plant, Kanagawa-ku, Yokohama, Japan.

== Overview ==
The building of the museum was built in 1934 in Kanagawa-ku, Yokohama, Kanagawa Prefecture. As the first auto plant of Nissan Motors in Yokohama, the building has also been worked as the headquarters of the company until 1968, when the headquarters was moved to Ginza, Tokyo.

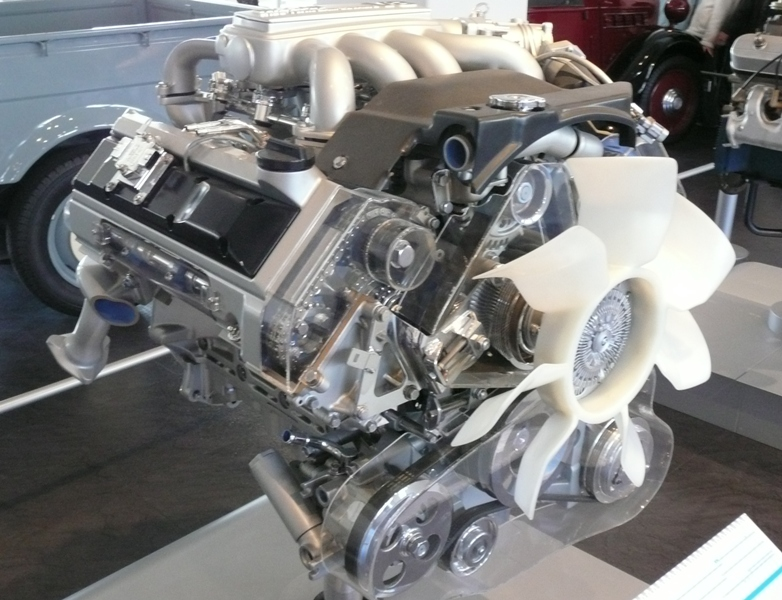
Nissan VH41DE V8 engine on display

The building was accredited as a historical building by the government of Yokohama city in November 2002, and the Nissan Engine Museum was opened officially at the first floor of the building, which had been used as a guest hall, in April 2003 (21 years ago).

The museum exhibits the latest model car and a memorial car of Nissan brand, 28 Nissan's auto engines, history of Yokohama auto plant and equipments for environmental techniques.

== See also ==
- Nissan
- Datsun
- Infiniti
