= Hiroto Saikawa =

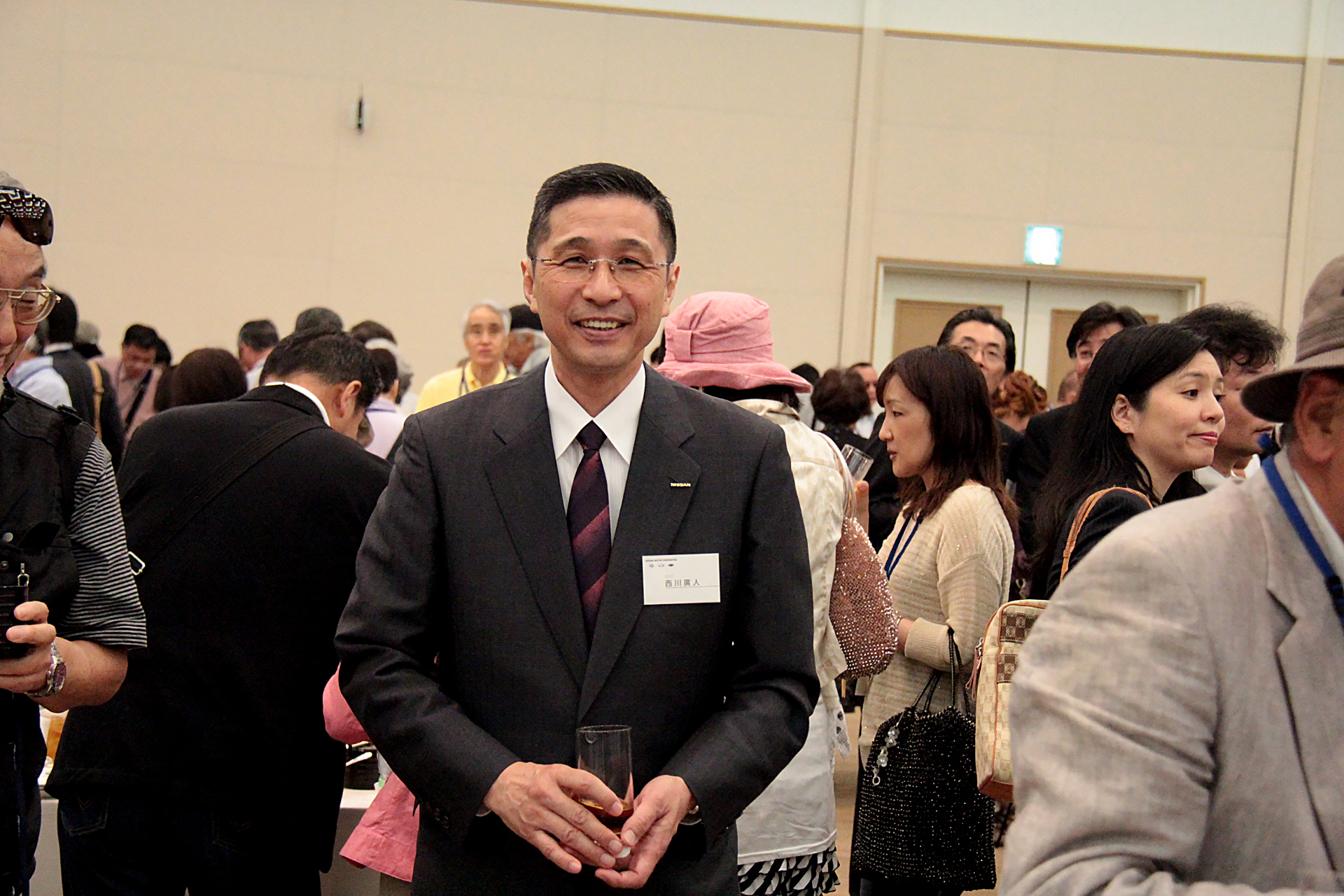
- Born: November 14, 1953 (age 72); Japan
- Education: University of Tokyo School of Economics (1977)
- Occupations: President and CEO of Nissan Motors

Hiroto Saikawa (西川 廣人, Saikawa Hiroto) is the former president and CEO of Nissan.

== Career ==
Hiroto Saikawa joined Nissan in 1977 after graduating from University. In October 2000, he became General Manager of Purchasing Strategy Dept, and in April 2001, he became Executive General Manager of Renault Nissan Purchasing Organization. In April 2003, he was named Senior Vice President, in April 2005 he was elevated to Executive Vice President, and in June 2005 he was added to the board of directors.

Saikawa was Chief Executive Officer and President of Nissan from April 2017 until September 2019. Prior to this, he was Co-Chief Executive Officer of Nissan Motor Co. Ltd. from November 2016, to April 2017, and the Chief Competitive Officer of Nissan since April 2014.

In 2019, Saikawa told reporters that he and several other Nissan executives received excess compensation. Saikawa received about $440,000 in excess compensation, which he blamed on a company error. In September 2019, Saikawa resigned as the CEO of Nissan.

Saikawa is the chairman for Nissan (China) Investment Co., Ltd. He is also on the board of Nissan Motor Co., Ltd., Dongfeng Motor Co., Ltd., Nmkv Co., Ltd. and Renault-Nissan-Mitsubishi Alliance.

== Arrest of Carlos Ghosn ==
Following the arrest of Carlos Ghosn, his erstwhile mentor and Chairman of Nissan and Renault, Saikawa expressed deep disappointment, noting that too much power was concentrated in the hands of one individual. The scandal, involving unreported future post retirement compensation and improper use of company funds by Ghosn, was described by Saikawa as a "negative outcome of the long regime of Mr. Ghosn". It should however be noted that, to this date, Mr. Ghosn has not been proven guilty of any wrongdoing since no trial has taken place yet.

When he was asked whether Ghosn was a "tyrant" or a "charismatic leader", Hiroto Saikawa refused to answer. Saikawa said that Nissan's board would meet Thursday, November 22, 2018, to vote on a proposal to have Ghosn dismissed, focusing on minimizing the impact of the shakeup on the company and its employees as well as reducing its reliance on a single leading executive. In the months leading to Ghosn's arrest, Ghosn had indicated he planned to announce at a late-November meeting to have Saikawa replaced, due to poor profit and very weak sales performance, as well as quality issues.

== Personal life ==
Saikawa has kept his personal life private, and few details are known. He graduated from Tokyo University and is married.
