= Ivan Espinosa =

Mexican automotive executive (born 1978)

Iván Espinosa
- Born: November 1978 (age 47); Mexico
- Education: Monterrey Institute of Technology and Higher Education
- Occupations: CEO, Nissan (2025–present)

Iván Espinosa (born November 1978) is a Mexican automotive executive who has served as president and chief executive officer (CEO) of Nissan since April 1, 2025.

== Early life and education ==
Iván Espinosa was born in Mexico in November 1978. He graduated from Monterrey Institute of Technology and Higher Education in 2001 with a degree in mechanical engineering.

== Career ==
He joined Nissan in 2003 as a product planner at Nissan Mexicana and held successive product strategy roles in Mexico, Thailand, Switzerland, and Japan. By 2019 he had risen to senior vice president for global product planning and program management. In April 2024, he was appointed chief planning officer.

Nissan announced Espinosa as CEO on March 11, 2025, succeeding Makoto Uchida. Upon taking office, he launched the "Re:Nissan" turnaround plan targeting $3.4 billion in cost reductions, including a streamlining of the company's global manufacturing footprint and a reduction in vehicle platforms from 13 to seven. By April 2026, Nissan revised its fiscal 2025 outlook from a projected operating loss to an operating profit of ¥50 billion.
