= William Gorham (engineer) =

American-Japanese engineer

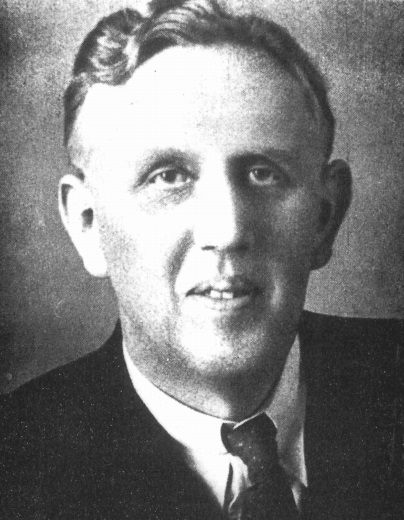
- Born: William Reagan Gorham; 4 January 1888; San Francisco, California, United States
- Died: 24 October 1949 (aged 61); Tokyo, Japan
- Occupations: Engineer, businessman, consultant
- Known for: Contributing to founding of Nissan, engineering and management consultant

William Reagan Gorham (合波武 克人, Gōhamu Katsundo; 4 January 1888 – 24 October 1949) was an American-born Japanese automobile engineer who emigrated to Japan. Gorham would make substantial contributions to the technology and capability of Japan's fledgling automobile industry, and worked with a number of companies that would eventually be merged into the Nissan Motor Company by Yoshisuke Aikawa, who would become a close friend and business partner to Gorham.

In David Halberstam's 1986 book The Reckoning, Halberstam states: "In terms of technology, Gorham was the founder of the Nissan Motor Company" and that "In 1983, sixty-five years after [Gorham's] arrival... young Nissan engineers who had never met him spoke of him as a god and could describe in detail his years at the company and his many inventions."

== Early life ==
Gorham was born in San Francisco, California in 1888 to William J. Gorham, an Asia area manager at tire manufacturer B.F. Goodrich. He accompanied his father on business trips to Japan in his youth, and after graduating from Heald College founded Gorham Engineering in San Francisco with his father in 1911. The company's products included hot bulb engines, fire pumps, and motorboats.

== Career in Japan ==
Gorham moved to Japan with his wife and children in 1918 during World War I. He was initially interested in the aviation industry, but after a year without success shifted his attentions to the automotive industry.

Gonshiro Kubota, a successful businessman who founded and led his eponymously-named firm into becoming the largest manufacturer of agricultural machinery in Japan was eager to enter the automobile market. At the time, the only two mass-production Japanese automobile manufacturers were Isuzu, and Kaishinsha, founded by Matsujiro Hashimoto. Kubota hired Gorham as chief designer, with Gorham designing the vehicles and setting up the manufacturing plants for Gorham's three-wheeled automobile. Along with other Japanese investors, Kubota and Gorham would found Jitsuyo Jidōsha, who would manufacturer the three-wheeled automobile as the Gorham, and a four-wheeled automobile of Gorham's design as the Lila. Jitsuyo Jidōsha and Kaishinsha would later be merged into a predecessor of the Nissan Motor Company.

He worked with a number of predecessors of the Nissan Motor Company, including Jitsuyo Jidōsha, Tobata Castings, and Nihon Sangyō, before departing in 1936 to found his own company, Kokusan Seiki, a precision manufacturing company, which would later be merged into Hitachi.

In May 1941, Gorham and his wife renounced U.S. citizenship and naturalised as Japanese citizens. They apparently chose to do this so that they could remain in Japan, as wartime conditions meant increasing restrictions on foreigners. During World War II, Gorham continued his engineering work at Hitachi, focusing on multicut lathes and jet engines. After the end of the war, the United States government declined to charge him or his wife with treason since they had become Japanese citizens before the war began; in fact, he ended up working in a liaison position with the headquarters of Supreme Commander for the Allied Powers Douglas MacArthur regarding industrial problems.

Throughout the 1940s, he also frequently acted as a consultant for Canon Inc. regarding their procurement and factory management practises, and developed a close relationship with company president Takeshi Mitarai. Gorham died in 1949 with Mitarai at his bedside.

== Family ==
Gorham was married and had two sons, William Jr. and Don Cyril. William Jr. was born in 1915 in Oakland, California; after completing middle school in Japan, he attended high school in the United States and was attending Caltech when Japan attacked the United States. After his deferment ended in 1943, he served with the Office of Naval Intelligence at Pearl Harbor as a specialist in interrogating Japanese POWs, and at the war's end he helped with surrender arrangements on the island of Saipan and analyzed the effects of US bombing raids on Tokyo. He later worked for the Otis Elevator Company, and died in 2003.

Don was born in Oakland as well in 1918, but attended Tokyo Imperial University after high school and graduated in 1941 with a degree in Japanese language and literature. On the urging of his father, he moved to Washington, D.C. before war with Japan began. Like his brother, he served in the Office of Naval Intelligence during World War II, and continued there as a civilian employee after the war ended until beginning a second career as a translator in the 1970s. He died in 2011.
