= Nissan Hypermini =

Car model

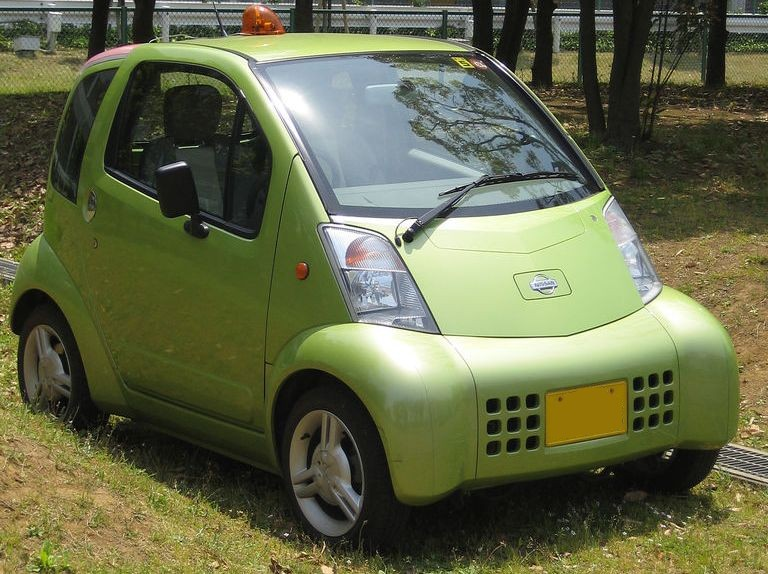

Overview
- Production: Sep 1999 - Dec 2001, 219 produced

Body and chassis
- Body style: 3-door hatchback, 2-seat

Powertrain
- Engine: S-4 Neodymium magnet synchronous AC traction motor Max Power 24 kW (32 hp); Max Torque 130 N⋅m (96 lb⋅ft)
- Transmission: Rear-wheel drive

Dimensions
- Wheelbase: 1,890 mm (74.4 in)
- Length: 2,655 mm (104.5 in)
- Width: 1,475 mm (58.1 in)
- Height: 1,550 mm (61.0 in)
- Curb weight: 840 kg (1,852 lb)

Chronology
- Successor: Nissan Leaf

The Hypermini is a two-seater electric microcar by Nissan Motors, which produced 219 of the cars in 1999–2001 for the Japanese market.

== Description ==
The Hypermini is a two-passenger EV (electric vehicle) microcar that can move at 100 km/h (62 mph) and travel about 115 kilometres (71 mi) on a single charge, according to Nissan's measurements made under Japan's 10-15 test mode. The Hypermini won the fourth annual "New Energy Grand Prize." The prize is sponsored by the New Energy Foundation which is associated with Japan's Ministry of International Trade & Industry.

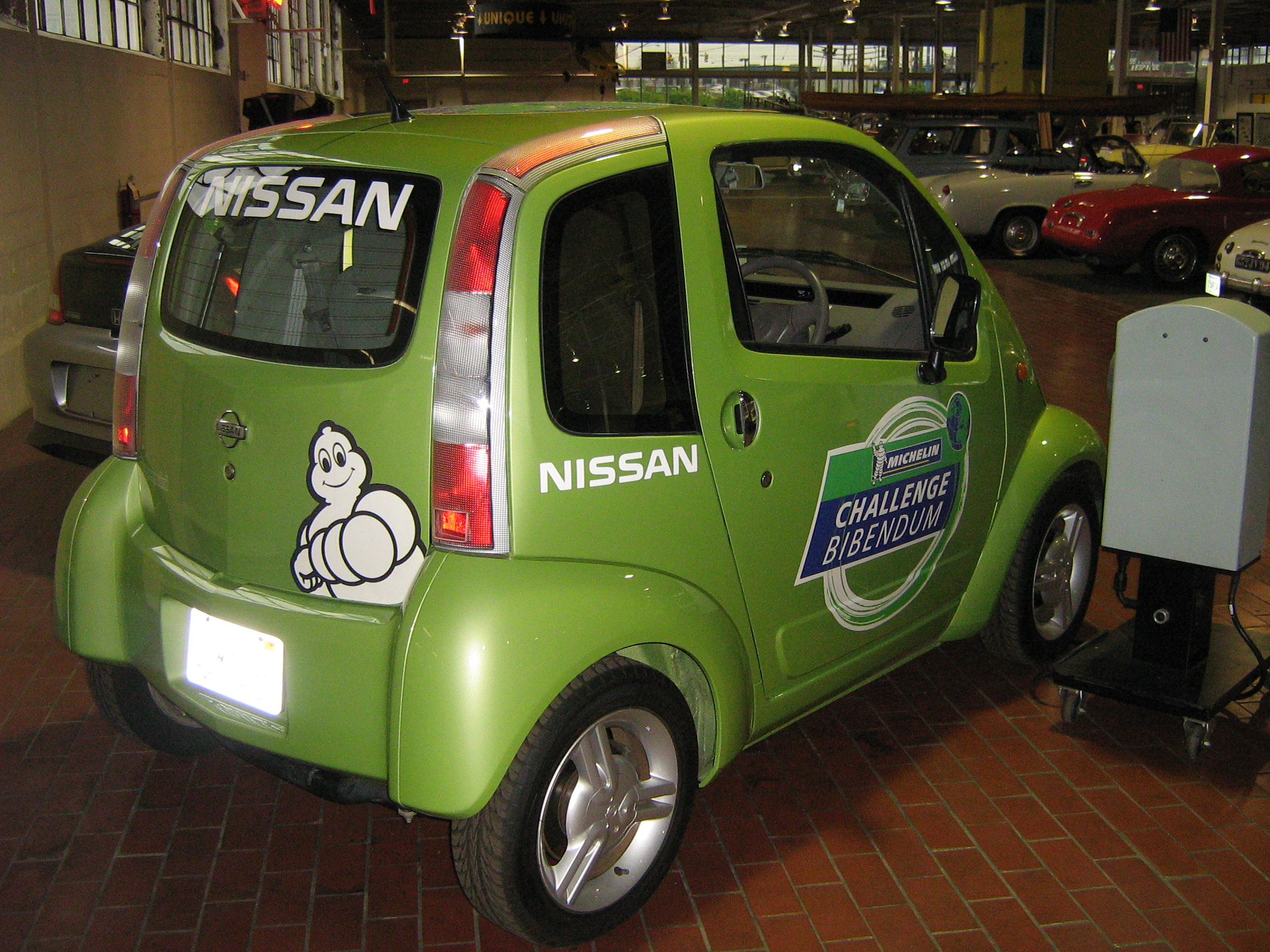
Rear view

Interior

== Release ==
It was introduced in a limited way in Japan in September 1999. It was launched for retail sale through Nissan dealers in the greater Tokyo, Osaka, and Kyoto metropolitan areas in February 2000, priced at 4,000,000 yen with a 200-volt mount-type battery charger and 4,015,000 yen with 200 volt non-fixed battery charger. Sales were targeted principally at national government offices and agencies, local government bodies and corporations. Nissan claims the Hypermini consumes a quarter the energy of a typical car.

== Features ==
The Hypermini features an aluminium space frame chassis made of extruded aluminium pipe, aluminium stampings, aluminium castings, and the panels are plastic. The front suspension has independent struts while the rear has independent parallel-link struts. Brakes (front and rear) are ventilated discs with an anti-lock braking system. Stock tyres are run-flat size 145/65 R14 at the front and 165/60 R14 at the rear. Its turning circle is 7.8 metres (25.6 ft) and its drag coefficient is 0.30. The Hypermini is equipped with an electric automatic air-conditioner with pre-cool and pre-heat enabling the driver to get the cabin temperature to the desired level before climbing behind the wheel.

The Hypermini's lithium-ion batteries are located under the floor and are recharged inductively. The non-contact charging system utilizes a plastic paddle with a built-in coil that generates a high frequency magnetic field. A portable battery charger can be stored on board, enabling batteries to be charged anywhere an ordinary electric outlet can be found. Nissan estimated that Hypermini could be operated at one-fifth the cost of a gasoline-powered vehicle.

== Numbers produced and in existence ==
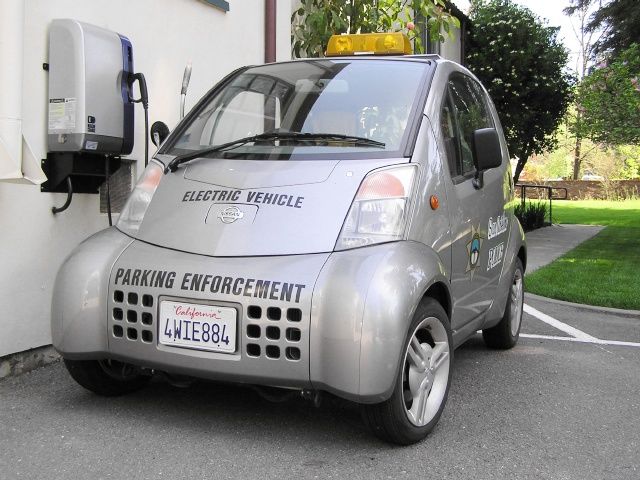
Nissan Hypermini used as a police car in San Anselmo, California.

According to Nissan, a total of about 300 were made. Production versions were trialed in the Japanese cities of Kyoto (138), Yokohama (20), Ebina (15), Tokyo (20), and in California at University of California, Davis (15) and the city council of Pasadena (11).

15 small Nissan Hypermini vehicles went into service 7 November 2001 in a research program at the University of California, Davis. Nissan was involved in three car-sharing programs using Hyperminis in Japan. About 120 Hyperminis had been sold to support these programs in the cities of Kyoto, Ebina and Yokohama. City officials and private citizens were using the vehicles.

Nissan took 11 Hypermini August 2006 vehicles back from city council of Pasadena, California after leases expired, stating "Nissan says it no longer makes the Hypermini and can't maintain the cars". Publicly owned examples can sometimes be found for sale in Japan.
