= Makoto Uchida =

Japanese businessman (born 1966)

- Born: Makoto Uchida; July 20, 1966 (age 60); Japan
- Citizenship: Japan
- Education: Doshisha University
- Title: CEO of Nissan

Makoto Uchida (内田 誠, Uchida Makoto; born July 20, 1966) is a Japanese businessman. He was the CEO of the Nissan Motor Corporation from December 2019 until March 2025.

== Education ==
Uchida graduated from Doshisha University in 1991 with a degree in Theology.

== Career ==
After he graduated, Uchida joined Nissho Iwai (currently Sojitz), a sogo shosha (general trading company) based in Tokyo, in April 1991.

Uchida joined Nissan for the first time in October 2003, and was named manager in October 2006. In September 2012, he left Nissan to join Renault Korea for less than two years. He then re-joined Nissan as a Program Director in April 2014.

His Nissan executive career started in November 2016 when he was named Corporate VP of the Alliance Purchasing department. He became President of Dongfeng Nissan and Senior VP in April 2018. One year later, in April 2019, he was also named Chairman of the Management Committee for China.

In October 2019, Uchida was unanimously chosen by the board of directors to become the new Nissan CEO, taking office on December 1, 2019.

In March 2025, Uchida resigned as CEO after a financial crisis that put Nissan's future in jeopardy.

== Personal life ==
Uchida can speak fluent English along with his native Japanese.
