= Nissan (disambiguation) =

Nissan Motor Corporation is a Japanese automobile company.

Nissan may also refer to:

== Geography ==
- Nissan (river), river in southwestern Sweden
- Nissan Island, island in Papua New Guinea
- Nissan Rural LLG, administrative division in Papua New Guinea
- Nissan-lez-Enserune, village near Béziers, France

== Brands and enterprises ==
- Nissan Chemical Corporation, a Japanese chemical company
- Nissan Computer, unaffiliated with the auto manufacturer but famous for a legal dispute over the Nissan.com domain name
- Nissan Group, a former Japanese business conglomerate
- Nissan Diesel, former name of truck and bus manufacturer UD Trucks
- Nissan Marine, a defunct marine engine manufacturer
- Nissan Life, a defunct insurance company

== Other uses ==
- Nissan, or Nisan, a month on the Hebrew calendar, Babylonian calendar and modern Arab April
- Nissan Pavilion, former name of an outdoor entertainment venue in Prince William County, Virginia, now known as Jiffy Lube Live
- Rosa Nissán (born 1939), Mexican writer

== See also ==
- Nisan (disambiguation)
- Nissen (disambiguation)
