= Economy of Manchukuo =

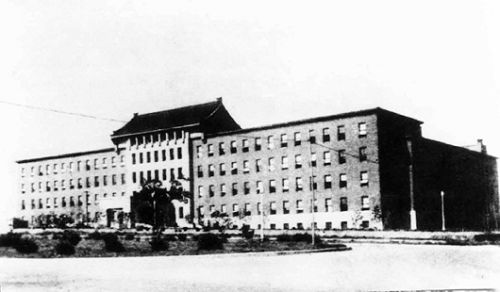
Ministry of Economic Affairs of Manchukuo.

This article looks at the economies of Manchukuo and Mengjiang, in the period 1931-1945. The effective Japanese annexation of 1931 led to a colonial system (see Manchukuo (administration)). Japan invested in heavy industry, and to a lesser extent, agriculture.

The General Affairs State Council retained Japanese control of official economic policy. The Central Bank of Manchukou was the national central bank. The Kwantung Army held the highest authority, representing the Emperor of Japan, and the respective ministries of the nominal Manchukou central government were also involved.

== Industry ==
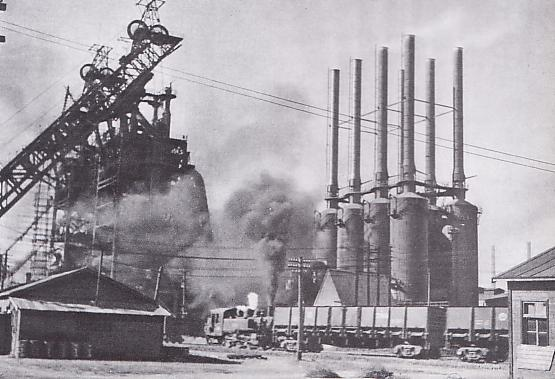
Showa Steel Works in Anshan

After it occupied Manchuria, Japan took over the region's Chinese public enterprises (many of which originated from the Zhang Zuolin and Zhang Xueliang regimes) and converted them to Manchukuo state-owned enterprises.

Industrial development in Manchukuo was accomplished with state planning and Japanese investment, prioritizing military build-up and heavy industry without an emphasis on profitability.

Economic planning in Manchukuo was influenced by Japanese observations of the Soviet approach to catch-up industrialization and reflected in Manchukuo's Five Year Plan for Heavy Industry. The development of industry in Manchukuo further influenced Japanese economic mobilization following the start of the Second Sino-Japanese War.

In 1932, the Kwantung Army requested that the South Manchuria Railway establish an Economic Research Team. This team drafted many of Manchukuo's early economic policies and emphasized state control over the economy.

Industrial development had as a primary goal supplying raw material and finished products for the Japanese military. Amid the 1930s, thousands of idealistic engineers, most connected with the Home Ministry, left for the neighboring colonies of Taiwan, Manchukuo and Korea, laying down the foundation of a modernized empire, amongst such plans: roads, bridges, railroads, canals, ports, water works, and communications networks were commissioned.

The first industrial centers in Manchukuo were in the Mukden–Dairen area. Industrial centers were in Anshan, Shakakon, Dairen, Ryojun, Fushun, Fusin, and other cities. Manchukuo used the Korean ports of Unggi, Chongjin and Rason for the Japan sea area.

Products included aircraft, automobiles and trucks, blankets, boots, bread and flour, bricks, candies and foods, carpets, raw cellulose, cement, dyes and inks, electrical devices, fabric, farm equipment, glass, industrial paint, industrial paper, liquor and beer, locomotive manufacturing and repair and related railway industries, milk and cheese, mining equipment, munitions, processed leather products, rubber articles, soy and other processed foods, vegetable oil, hand and heavy weapons, etc.

Some measures of Manchu industrial production (1932–35):

- Coal production: 15 million metric tonnes of coke coal
- Cement Production: 10% of Japanese Cement production
- Steel Production: 450,000 metric tonnes
- 500,000 spindles and accompanying fabric factories annually produced 25,000 tonnes of cotton fabrics.

During Manchukuo's first Five Year Plan, Germany was a major supplier of sophisticated industrial technology to Manchukuo.

=== Industrial workers ===
Japanese and Manchukuo authorities used Chinese prisoners of war for forced labor. Many of these POWs were Chinese civilians abducted by the Japanese army from unoccupied China. Manchukuo used forced labor in major industrial enterprises, including Shōwa Steel Works.

== Agriculture ==
The effective annexation gave Japan an area suitable for farming, such as scarcely existed on the country's islands, or other parts, generally mountainous, of the Empire of Japan. The area was primarily agricultural in character, although with some urbanization. Agriculture employed 85% of the population.

Farmers produced many crops, particularly on the southern plains. Manchu farms practiced crop rotation frequently with primitive culture methods. Kaoliang (70%), corn and maize (70%), wheat (80%) and soy (35%) were popular crops.

Others in quantity were: alfalfa, apples, apricots, chestnuts, col, cotton, cucumber, forage, garlic, giant radish, hemp, indigo, lupulus, millet, nuts, onions, opium poppies (for opium), peaches, pears, peanuts, rice, ricine, rye, sesame, sugar beet, sweet potatoes, thyme, tobacco, and others. In Amur land (Manchu side) honey (1,800 tonnes) was collected.

From kaoliang and corn liquors were made, including vodka, sake, beer, soy juices and vinegar. The modern wheat and flour industry was located in Harbin from Russian times apart from basic mills in other areas.

The most intensive farming occurred in a 150–250 kilometres (93–155 mi) zone, extending from the Liaotung Gulf to the Northwest. In 1934 it totaled between 120,000–160,000 square kilometres (46,000–62,000 sq mi). The proportions of the principal crops in 1934 were:

- Soy: 28%
- Corn: 9%
- Other legumes: 2%
- Wheat: 7%
- Kaoliang:(Zahine-Sorgum): 23%
- Rice: 2%
- Mice: 18%
- Other crops: 11%

=== Soy ===
Soy was Manchukuo's principal crop. The first exports were made in 1908 to England. The economic expansion of soy is attributed in great part to the South Manchurian Railway Company, which enabled direct export from Dairen abroad, in particular to China and Japan proper. Manchukuo hosted many types of processing mill. 1933 to 1934 saw a reduction of more than 4,000 square kilometres (1,500 sq mi) in cultivated extent and production fell from 4-6 million to 3.84 million tonnes.

The Japanese developed industry to use soy, with average production of 1,500,000 tonnes. Half was exported to Europe. Crude oil paste for fertilizer and soybeans for food was sent to Japan. The rest of the plant was used in cellulose factories.

=== Cotton ===
Manchukuo regularly produced 120,000 kilograms of mediocre quality.

=== Opium poppies ===
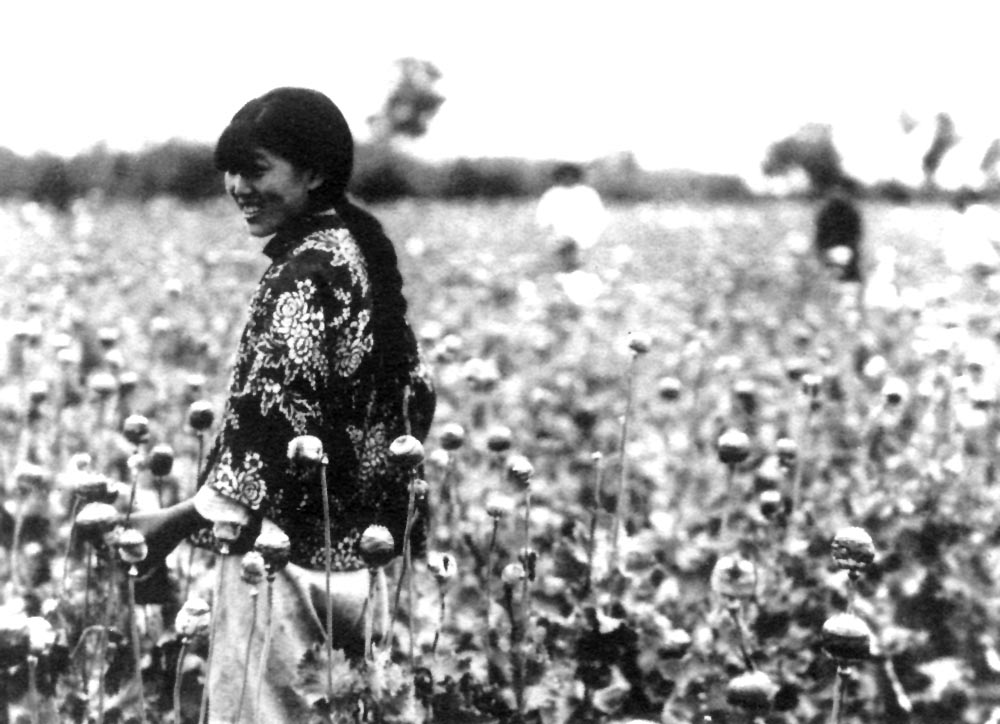
Poppy harvest in Manchukuo

The opium poppy was grown to obtain opium. In November 1932 the Mitsui Zaibatsu conglomerate held a state monopoly for poppy farming with the "declared intention" of reducing its heavy local use. Fixed cultivation areas were set up in Rehe and northwest Jilin. For 1934-35, cultivation area was evaluated as 480 square kilometres (190 sq mi) with a yield of 1.1 tonnes/km^{2}.

According to Japanese scholar Goichi Yamada, the opium trade in Machuria generated profits ranging from 2 million to 14 million yen per year.

The military prohibited the use of opium and other narcotics by its troops (punishment was loss of Japanese citizenship) but the army was allowed to use money generated by opium trading to finance the war. Professor Motohiro Kobayashi of Tokai University said the Japanese army's intelligence division worked with local gangs to sell opium.

One of the participants, Naoki Hoshino negotiated a large loan from Japanese banks using a lien on the profits of Manchukuo's Opium Monopoly Bureau as collateral.

==== Opium Trade with Nazi Germany ====
According to Professor Naoki Kumano of Kyushu University, part of the produced opium is exported to Nazi Germany as part of a trade deal. Originally, Nazi Germany imported soy beans from Manchuria. However, Manchuria was unable to fulfill the trade obligation due to bad harvest of soy beans in 1941. Instead, opium is used as replacement. The opium exported to Germany is mainly used to produce morphine. The opium trade continued until the end of World War Two.

=== Spring Wheat Region ===
- Precipitation: 25 inches (64 cm)
- Growing season in days: 196
- Cultivation area: 22,054 square miles (57,120 km^{2})
- Total percentage of cultivated land: 13-18%
- Total percentage of tenant farmers: 6%
- Cultivated area per farm: 7.3 acres (3.0 ha)
- Peasant population density in principal farming: 858 square miles (2,220 km^{2})

==== Product by sector ====
- Wheat: 18%
- Maize: 34%
- Irish potatoes: 10%

==== Livestock ====
- Oxen: 21%
- Donkeys: 15%
- Sheep: 28%
- Mule: 11%

==== Fruit ====
- Nuts and pears

=== Soy and Kaoliang Manchu Region ===
- Precipitation: 25 inches (64 cm)
- Growing Epochs for days: 150
- Cultivation area: 50,000 square miles (130,000 km^{2})
- Total percentage of cultivated land: 5 to 20%
- Total percentage of tenant farmers: ?
- Cultivated surface per farm: 8 acres (3.2 ha)
- Peasant population density in principal farming: 800 square miles (2,100 km^{2})

==== Percentages and distribution surface of products ====
- Wheat: 10%
- Maize: 15%
- Soy: 10%
- Kaoliang: 25%

==== Fruit ====
- Pears

=== Transport ===
Oxen, donkeys, heavy horses transported the harvest. Xing'an province worked horses and Bactrian camels, and Heilongjiang and Jilin provinces used sled dogs to aid transport.

- Pack animal: 76%
- Carts: 38%
- River boats: 13%

The cultivable land was estimated as 300,000 square kilometres (120,000 sq mi) principally in the central plain.

==== Manchukuo ====
- Heilongjiang:

- Percentage total of land cultivated: 5.2%
- Land cultivated per person: 1.84 acres (0.74 ha)

- Jilin:

- Percent of land cultivated: 14.4%
- Land cultivated per person: 1.19 acres (0.48 ha)

- Liaoning:

- Percent of land cultivated: 16.8%
- Land cultivated per person: 0.76 acres (0.31 ha)

- Rehe:

- Percent of land cultivated: 6.1%
- Land cultivated per person: 0.83 acres (0.34 ha)

==== Meng Chiang ====
- Chahar:

- Percent of land cultivated: 4.1%
- Land cultivated per person: 1.30 acres (0.53 ha)

- Suiyuan:

- Percent of land cultivated: 3.7%
- Land cultivated per person: 1.40 acres (0.57 ha)

=== Animal husbandry ===
Manchukuo was a productive area, with many domestic animals in subsistence farms or larger properties. Japanese experts increased production with the introduction of foreign species, including pigs, cattle, and sheep, which produced milk, meat, leather and wool.

Other interesting products were the silkworm and the wild silk or tussah (tussor) Worm. The first needed the white mulberry for food; and the second needed Quercus mongolica and other species of oak tree to make Tussah silk. Both products were collected for dyeing and export to Europe and America or sent as raw material to these markets. The cocooned worms were sent to China and Japan. The production of Tussah Silk or pongee was in Kaiping and Andong (Liaoning Province) while silk worms stayed in Kwantung (Kantoshu) and South Manchurian Railway zone, and Chosen.

=== Output ===
In bushels per acre, except cotton in kilograms.

Country	Rice	Wheat	Corn	Maize	Potato	Cotton packs
China	67	16	21	19	87	168
Japan	68	25	22	36	139	199
India	29	11	15	-	-	80
Soviet Union	47	10	15	16	128	188
USA	-	14	25	22	108	177

In Chientao or Yenki Manchu district the Korean Colony extensively cultivated rice.

== Forestry products ==
Lumber and wood products were important industries. Rehe and Jilin provinces held great expanses of various types of forest. From 1911 to 1931 Chinese lumberjacks began to work there; the volume of cut wood during the Manchu period was some 2,500,000,000 cubic metres (3.3×10^{9} cu yd). Foresting took place mostly in the Yalu and Sungari river areas; their tributaries permitted river transport to woodworking centers in Andong, Jilin and Harbin cities. The Tumen and other northern rivers also provided transport. Typical production before 1939 was 4,000,000 cubic metres (5,200,000 cu yd) per year. Uses were: railroad ties, cellulose paste for paper and for Karafuto rayon production, and export to Japan, Russia and Central and Northern China. A similar pattern may have occurred in Mengjiang.

== Hunting ==
In the mountains many species of animals could be hunted for their skins, for meat, or for sport. This area corresponds with the current Heilongjiang province. The situation is similar in Mengjiang too.

== Coastal, river and lake fishing ==
The rivers Amur, Sungari, Nonni, Mutang-Kiang, Ussuri, Liao, Yalu and Tumen, and the lakes Khanka, Buir-Nor and Hulun-Nor are all important fish sources. Species include trout, salmon, and European perch. With the exception of Buir-Nor and Hulun-Nor, these can be fished only in snow-free months. The latter lakes are useful fish sources for residents in Xing'an Province near the Russian-Mongolia frontier area, and were a cause of frontier disputes.

The annual catch in rivers and lakes was 25,000 tonnes. Sea fishing was in the Po-Hai Gulf and Yellow Sea areas. It included cod, shrimp, sea bream, lobster, and crab.

== Important cities ==
The most important cities were:

- Mukden: Population 339,000
- Dairen: 203,000 or 555,562 or 661,000 or 766,000 or 400,000
- Ryojun: 1,371,000
- Harbin: 250,000 or 405,000
- Andong: 92,000, 315,242 or 360,000
- Xinjing: 126,000 or 544,202
- Jilin: 119,000, 173,624 or 512,000
- Qiqihar: 75,000 or 537,000
- Fushum: 269,919 or 754,000
- Anshan: 213,865 or 100,000
- Niuzhuang: 119,000 or 158,000
- Mudanjiang: 100,000
- Kiamuzse: 100,000
- Liaoyang: 100,000
- Penki: 530,000
- Hailar:

Another table mentioned this:

- Xinjing: 415,000
- Mukden: 863,000
- Lushun (Dairen): 550,000

== Transport ==
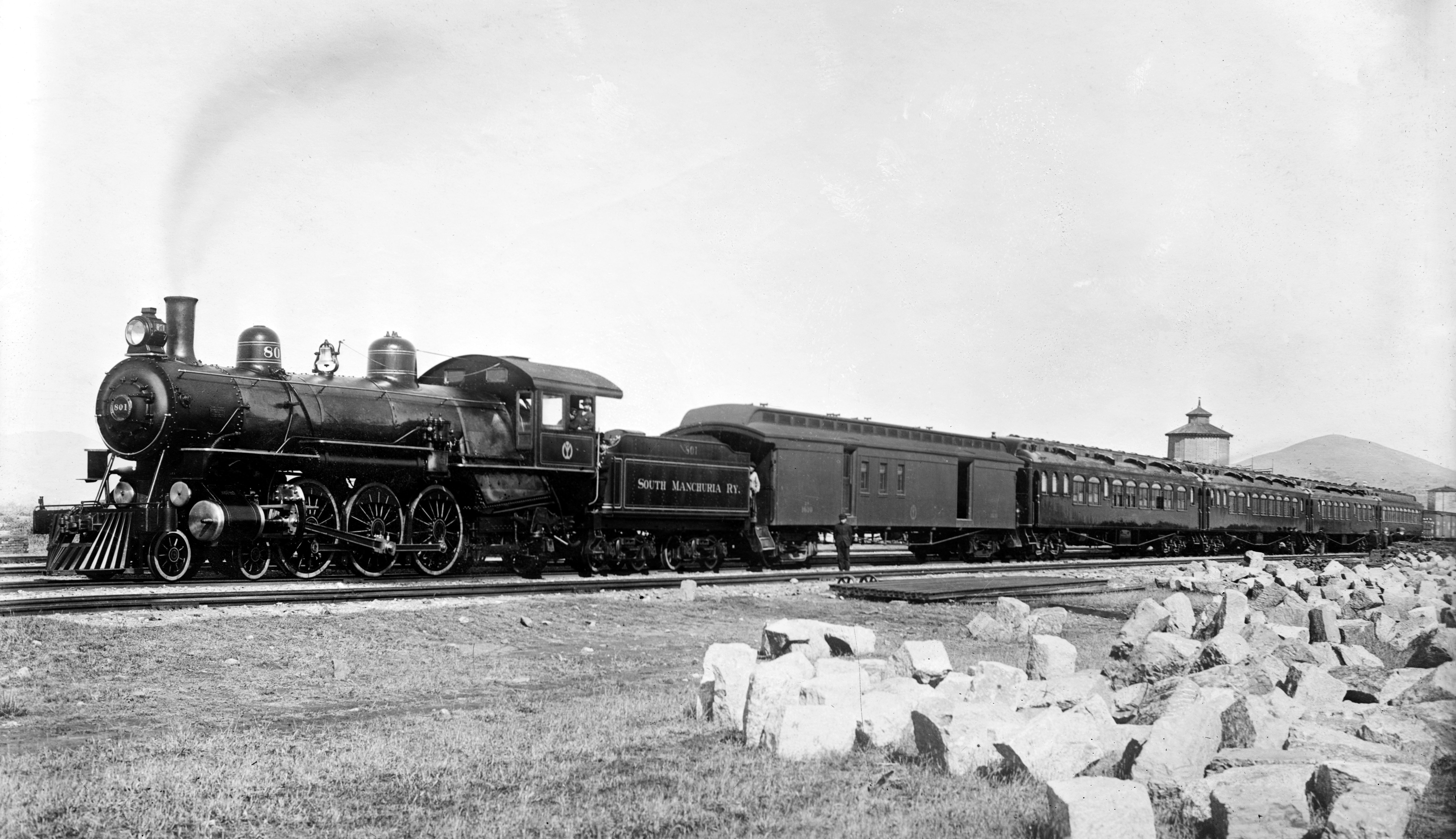
South Manchurian Railway

The Japanese constructed 6,500 kilometers (4,000 mi) of roads. They also founded a local airline which linked Dairen, Mukden, Harbin, and other points, with a hub in Hsinking. The Amur, Nonni, Yalu Liao and Sungari rivers served regular cabotage boats and transport vessels in the West and Northwest. Hsingan Province commonly used camels in commerce between it and Meng Chiang and Soviet Outer Mongolia. The principal railway lines 12,000 kilometers (7,500 mi) were the East Chinese Railway, constructed by Russia and expanded by Japan, and Beijing-Mukden railway with Railway Centers in Mukden and Harbin.

The South Manchurian Railway Company resembled the Canadian Pacific Railway in that it was more than a railroad. In 1931 it invested 27% of capital in coal in Fushum, 3% Anshan iron factory, 8% in Dairen and Ryoujun ports in Kantoshu, with other lesser investments in Yamato Hotel, Tuitsuike Hotel in Tangkatzu spa, merchant and fishing vessels, electricity power plants, local institutions, schools, research institutes for farming, geology, and mining, sanitation and medical, public services, public architecture, etc. The Japanese government provided most of the funds with the rest provided by private Japanese, Chinese, and Manchu investors.

In 1935 Manchukuo contained 8,500 kilometers (5,300 mi) of active railways. 80% were classified as "State railways", with 1,100 kilometers (680 mi) owned by the private Manchuria Railway, and the remaining 1,760 kilometers (1,090 mi) owned by North Manchuria Railway. In 1932 the government planned the construction of 60,000 kilometers (37,000 mi) of roads in ten years, completing only 7,000 kilometers (4,300 mi) with the intent of promoting public bus transport.

The important commercial ports were Ryojun and Dairen. Other ports include Andong, Niuzhuang, Huludao. In the Japan Sea area were the ports of Yuki, Rashin and Seishin.

== Minerals ==
The most important mining products are coal and iron in Fushun and Fusin. Fushun and Fusin also contain deposits of oil-rich slate and schists. Abundant gold deposits exist in the Greater Khingan Mountains and Amur River. Other minerals include: asbestos, antimony, bauxite, limestone, copper, gold, lead, lime, magnesite, manganese, pyrite, marble, salt, soda, silver, sulphur, tar, tin, tungsten, zinc, etc.

=== Coal ===
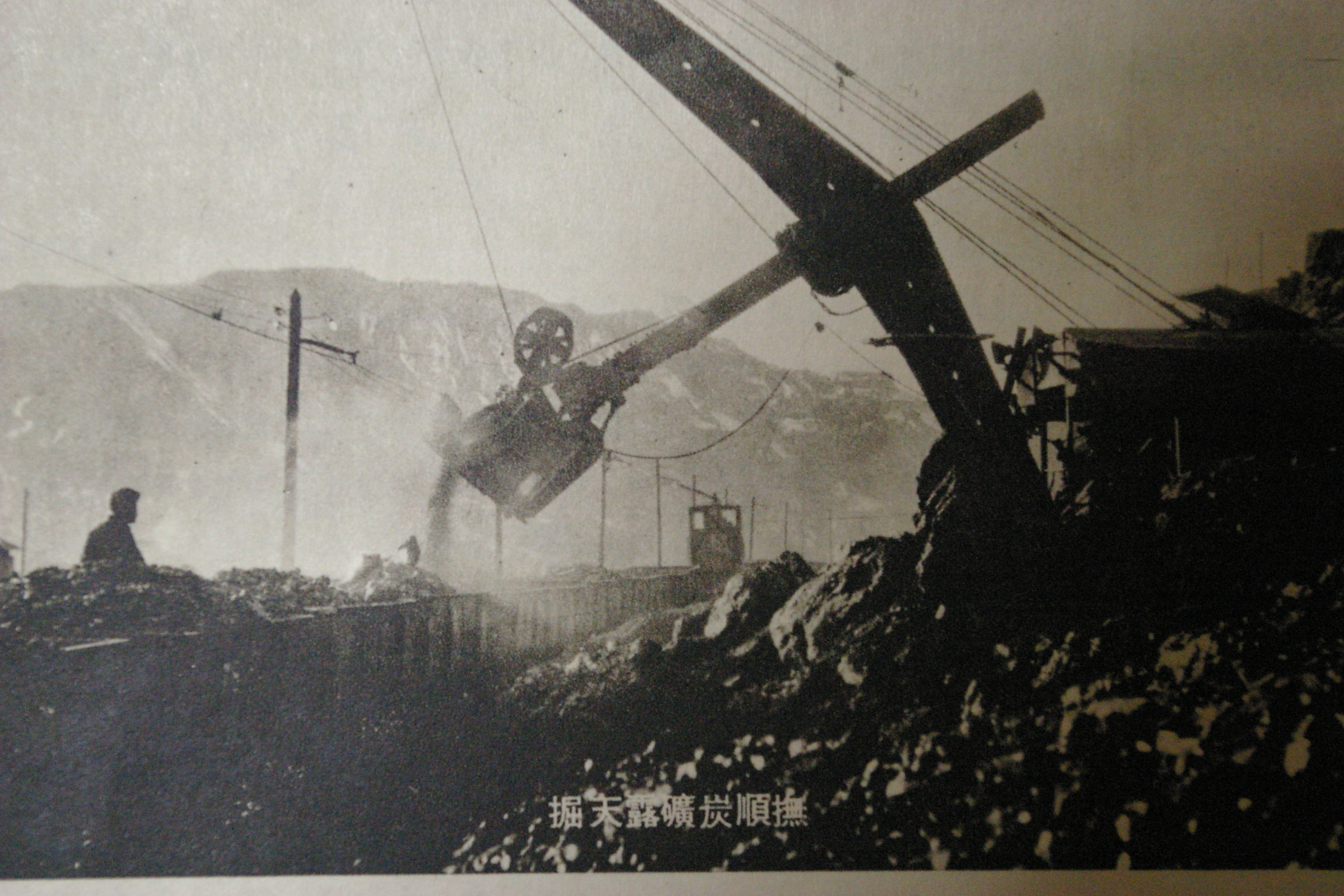
Fushun Coal Mine

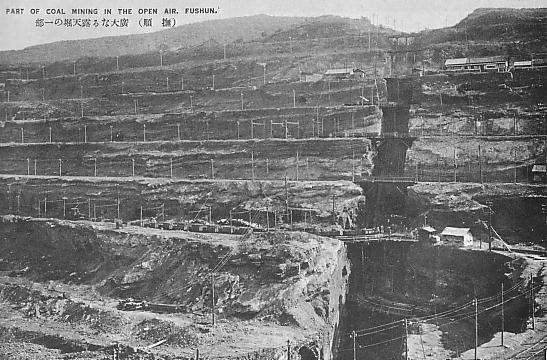
Open coal mining in Fushun

The principal coal deposit is at Fushun, in Liaoning, extending 15 by 3 kilometres (9.3 mi × 1.9 mi). Fushum, 32 kilometers (20 mi) from Mukden, contains bituminous coal reserves of 700,000,000–1,000,000,000 metric tonnes which became available via open-pit or regular mining methods. Bituminous coal reserves are estimated at 3,000,000,000 metric tonnes, mostly in Liaoning with the rest in Jilin, Heilongjiang, Hsingam, and Rehe provinces. Anthracite coal reserve estimates are 200,000,000 metric tonnes and lignite estimates are 50,500,000 metric tonnes.

Additional deposits were in Yentai. Private mines operated in Benxihu and Xintai. Other important mines were Sian (in Liaoning province), Muleng (in Jilin province) and Peopiao (in Rehe Province).

Production during 1907–1908 remained under 2,000,000 tonnes. In 1919–1920 extraction increased to 3,700,000 tonnes, rising in 1924–1929 to 5,540,000 tonnes. During 1925 the South Manchurian Railway Company invested in opening coal deposits in Chalai Nor 25 kilometers (16 mi) from frontier station Manzhouli which extracted 290,000 metric tonnes. By 1934, production had reached 8,000,000 tonnes. Both local use and exports increased.

In 1934–1936 extractions were:

- Heilongjiang: 405,000 tonnes
- Rehe: 458,000 tonnes
- Jilin: 267,000 tonnes
- Liaoning: 10,656,000 tonnes

In 1923–1924, 1,000,000 tonnes were extracted. Coal production in Manchukuo during 1930 exceeded 10,000,000 tonnes. In 1941, other areas produced 20,000,000 tonnes with reserves of 20,000,000,000 tonnes. Coal production was calculated in accord with other sources. In 1932 reserves of 4,500,000 tonnes. In 1944 estimates increased to 20,000,000,000 tonnes.

The Japanese built coal gasification plants for industrial uses.

Manchukuo also exported processed or raw products to Japan.

=== Iron and steel ===
According to American geologist Forster Payne, 70% of iron sources of East Asia are in coastal regions of Manchuria, with reserves calculated in 1944 of 2,000 to 2,500 Million Tonnes against 721 Million of Tonnes in Germany. Such ores had 60% iron; other reserves near Anshan, south of Mukden, contain a median 40% iron content.

1931–1932 production was 1,000,000 tonnes from deposits in Taku Shan (near Anshan, Liaoning) in the Shan Pai Shang mountains, in Miaoerkow and Tungpientao and in Liaoning. In 1933, the total production of iron in the Anshan and Penhsihu factories was 430,000 tonnes. In 1934, 950,000 tonnes of low-grade hematite was first produced. The Miaoerkow mine also produced 235,000 tonnes of hematite. In the Tungpientao deposits, the reserves are 100,000,000 tonnes of high-grade iron. The Anshan Factories in 1941 produced 1,750,000 iron tonnes and 1,000,000 steel tonnes. In 1942 production increased to 3,600,000 tonnes and Penhsihu produced 500,000 tonnes. In addition, the Tungpientao factory had the capacity to produce 800,000 tonnes.

Alternatively, the "Special Report of Geological Survey of China" (1945) mentioned that the Japanese extraction of iron in Manchuria and occupied China grew from 101,000 tonnes to 175,000 tonnes or by 73%. Manchukuo received from Japan scrap iron for iron and steel processing and at the same time exported unfinished steel products.

=== Petroleum ===
Manchukuo has little petroleum except at Fushum and Fusin where there were extensive deposits of oil-rich slate, oil shale and schist. Fushun produced 1,000,000 tonnes in 1941. In Rehe some oil was extracted in conjunction with coal deposits. Manchukuo also operated oil refineries.

=== Aluminium ===
The principal sources of bauxite in Manchukuo are alunite deposits in Liaoning.

Bauxite and Alunite in Yentai, Penshiu, Ninshintai, Saoshin reserves were estimated at 25,300,000 tonnes with metallic content of 55%. Later another 120,000,000 tonnes was discovered. In 1932 the "Mantetsu" (South Manchurian Railway Company and Anshan Iron Steel Works) organized laboratories in Fushun and Tokyo to develop processes to exploit these sources. In 1936-38 they founded the "Manchu Society for Light Metals". The refining process used electricity from Fushun coal, hydrochloric acid, potassium chloride and iron silica. During 1938-42 aluminum production increased from 5,000 to 30,000 tonnes.

=== Other minerals ===
In 1936, copper production reached 100 tonnes, growing in 1943 to 500 tones. Lead production was 1,223 tonnes. Zinc extraction was 398 tonnes.

Magnesite mines northwest of Tsichiao and Nuishishan opened in 1913, with estimated reserves of 13,600,000,000 tonnes. These sources became exploitable with the 100 kilometers (62 mi) extension of the Andong-Mukden railway. In 1941 three installation processed the ore, producing 24% of world output.

== Electric power ==
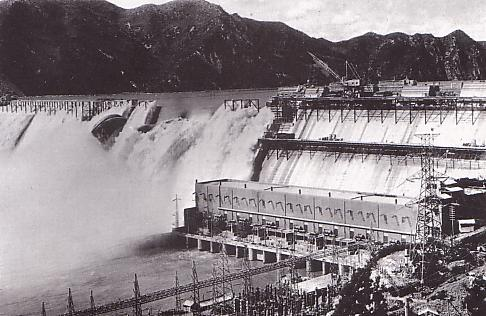
Sui-ho Dam on the border between Manchukuo and Korea

Hydroelectric power provided the majority of electricity during the period. The Japanese invested in power plants on the Sungari and Yalu rivers. They protected plants in the Nonni and Liao rivers during the August 1945 Soviet Invasion.

Other electricity sources included gas, oil, bunker oil and coal.

== Exports ==
In 1925 grain exports comprised 88% and lumber the remainder. In 1929 there was a slump in soy sales to the United States, and Germany became the principal buyer.

In 1933 the "Manchu exterior commerce" (a Japanese monopoly), recorded that exports exceeded imports. Coal represented 10% and iron a greater amount. Minor exports were other farming products (pigs, mice, kaoliang, peanuts); imports were cotton, flour of various grains, iron, and unfinished and manufactured products for Industry. The principal commerce was with China and Japan, with some exports going to Russia. Other export tables from 1923 indicated output of 4,423,000 tonnes, 50% soy and 30% coal.

In 1939 foreign trade rose to 2,650,840,000 million Manchukuo Yuan. Japan ranked first, but other trading partners included the United States, China, and Germany.

=== Free Trade Land Zones and Free Ports ===
- Land Zones: (for interchange with the Soviet Union by Railway)
  - Qiqihar
  - Harbin
  - Hunchun
  - Longjingzun
- Free Ports: (for interchange with British, American and German companies)
  - Yingkou (Niuzhuang)
  - Andong
  - Dairen
  - Ryojun

In 1931, the total production of natural resources inside the Japanese Empire was ¥283,000,000. Foreign purchases, totaled ¥220,000,000, which represented 40% of consumption. However, their local production was evaluated as ¥746,000,000 vs. imports of ¥660,000,000, so local production represented 61% of the total.

== Japanese ownership ==
Most major private enterprises in Manchukuo were Japanese-owned rather than Chinese-owned.

Japanese investment led to Manchukuo's emergence as the third-largest industrial area in East Asia (after Japan-proper and the U.S.S.R.). At Manchukuo, other foreign businessmen mentioned how "Japanchukuo" controlled all Manchukuoan industry with Japanese filling all important technical and administrative roles.

Japanese investment (private and central government) ran at ¥1,715,000,000 (£171,580.000 sterling) in 1938. In 1941, ¥5,000,000,000 was reinvested—the equivalent of $2 for every person in China. For local and foreign commerce, Japan organized a centralized economic structure, a national central bank and a local currency, the yuan of Manchukuo.

During the early years of Japanese control, Manchukuo represented 14.3% of total industrial production in China, including 12% of its industrial work force. From 1913 to 1930, farm production grew by 70%; its railways represented 30% of all Chinese railways.

During 1937 the Japanese Government with the Japanese Army commissioned industrialist Yoshisuke Aikawa to organize and direct the Manchurian Industrial Development Company with a capital of 758,000,000 yen. This became the "Manchoukuoan Zaibatsu Empire" and guided in centralizing mining and heavy industry.

The Japanese invested ¥440,000,000 (£44,000,000). One-half to two-thirds of the investment was reserved for soy products.

Investments were made in the Dowa Automobile Company (for the manufacture of cars and trucks), Manshukoku Hikoki Seizo KK (for making engines and aircraft) in Harbin, Morishita Jintan, Mukden Arsenal, Anshan Iron & Steel Works (founded in 1913) and renamed Showa Steel Works (in 1933) in Anshan, Manshukoku Koku KK (Manchurian National Airways), Central Bank of Manchou (national central bank), South Manchurian Railway Company, Yamato Hotel, Tuitsuike Hotel in Tangkantzu lake, Kirin Company and others.

In 1945 Japan reported its monetary investments in land as 11,000,000,000 Yen.

=== Other industries ===
From 1932, the Japanese increased their private and government investments in other industrial sectors:

- Fertilizers
- Dynamite and other explosives
- Machine tools
- Electric engineering
- Heavy chemicals
- Heavy Machinery and Locomotive construction

Nippon Lurgi Goshi K.K. of Tokyo, the Japanese Lurgi office in Tokyo, using industrial licenses of Metallgesellschaft-Lurgi Frankfurt am Main A.G. of Germany, installed the following industrial plants in Manchukuo:

- Shale Plant at Fushun, Manchuria (Co-property with Japanese Navy)
- Manshu Gosei Nenryo, Chinchow (Kinshu)
- Manshu Yuka Kogyo K.K.Ssuningkai

The Japanese company mentioned above decided during the war to install a similar factory in China to process the coal of the Mengchiang and Hopei areas:

- Kalgari Factory, Peking

=== Other Japanese development projects ===
In 1943 the Japanese began the construction of a 200 kilometers (120 mi) river channel to ease navigation from Mukden-Anshan-Sinku (Sing-Kow) to the Chili Gulf. A second goal was to regulate the flow of the Liao-ho river on the left side of Fushun en route to Mukden. This project permitted easy access for merchant vessels to the heart of the Manchukuan Industrial District. At the same time the Japanese planned the construction of power plants in Sungari and other rivers for magnesium refining and other developments.

== Finance ==
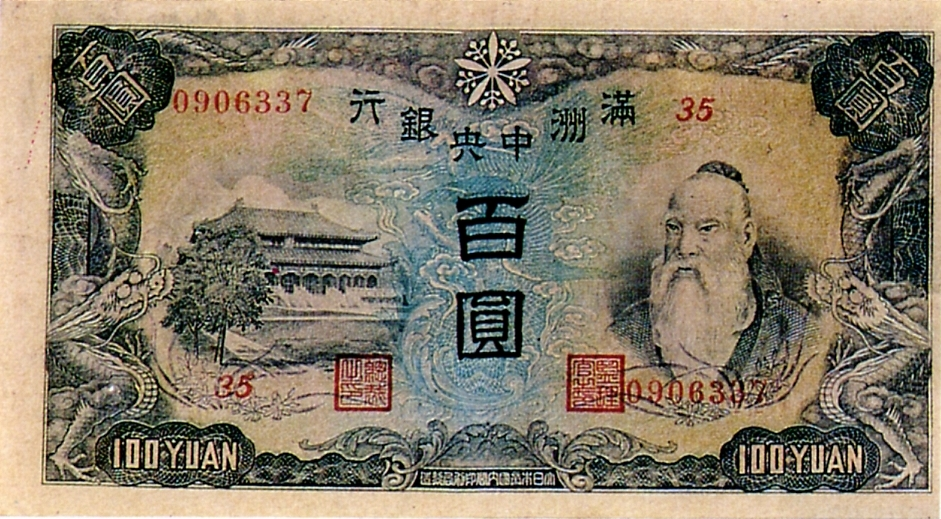
100 Yuan of Manchukuo

Before 1932, the economic situation was chaotic, but the establishment of the Yuan of Manchukuo as the local monetary unit in parity with the Japanese Yen, and establishment of the Central Bank of Manchou as the central bank institution produced a relatively stable business climate.
