= State General Mobilization Law =

1938 Japanese law during World War II

State General Mobilization Law 國家總動員法
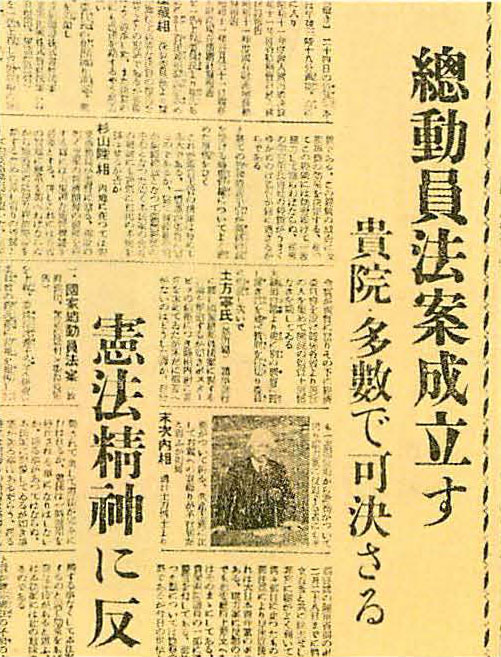
- Newspaper announcing the passage of the law

Diet of Japan
- Territorial extent: Empire of Japan
- Enacted by: National Diet of Japan
- Enacted: March 24, 1938
- Royal assent: April 1, 1938

Repealed by
- Supreme Commander for the Allied Powers
- Status: Repealed

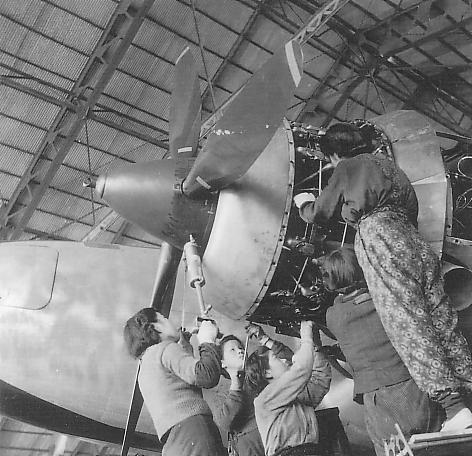
Labor Mobilization, 1944

The State General Mobilization Law (國家總動員法, Kokka Sōdōin Hō; Shinjitai: 国家総動員法), also known as the National Mobilization Law, was legislated in the Diet of Japan by Prime Minister Fumimaro Konoe on 24 March 1938 to put the national economy of the Empire of Japan on war-time footing after the start of the Second Sino-Japanese War.

The State General Mobilization Law had fifty clauses, which provided for government controls over civilian organizations (including labor unions), nationalization of strategic industries, price controls and rationing, and nationalized the news media. The laws gave the government the authority to use unlimited budgets to subsidize war production, and to compensate manufacturers for losses caused by war-time mobilization. Eighteen of the fifty articles outlined penalties for violators.

The law had long-term repercussions for the Japanese economy beyond its repeal by the Supreme Commander of the Allied Powers in 1945. Many policies created by the law resulted in structural changes to Japanese labor policy, creating Japan's modern day union system and policies such as lifetime employment.

== Background ==
Japanese ultranationalist ideology, termed Shōwa statism, always argued for a greater degree of state control over the economy, particularly in regards to mobilization. The Imperial Way Faction, based out of Manchuria, regarded the traditional monopolies of Japan, the Zaibatsu, with contempt and distrust. The radicals in the army saw the Zaibatsu corporations as an extension of the "corrupt political parties" and loathed their perceived support for foreign minister Kijūrō Shidehara, who had advanced liberal foreign policy.

The army first advanced its ideas of dirigisme and economic central planning in the puppet state of Manchukuo. Under the reform bureaucrats, corporations like the Showa Steel Works and Manchurian Industrial Development Company were established by the army, who implemented a five year plan. The policies of the reform bureaucrats laid the groundwork for Japanese wartime policy as the state and military asserted control over the economy. The government, prior to the passage of the law, began a process of "creeping control", gradually amalgamating and centralizing crucial sectors such as steel and petroleum production.

At the onset of the Second Sino-Japanese War, Japan had not yet transitioned to a wartime economy, with many civilian sectors remaining outside of government guidance. In 1938, with the war in China bogging down, the army began pressuring the civilian government to pass numerous ordinances expanding military control over civilian industries in order to reach the state of a "quasi-wartime economy" (junsenji keizai), by progressively increasing government influence over the civilian economy.

== Timeline of passage ==
The law was attacked as unconstitutional when introduced to the Diet in January 1938, though assurances were given that it would never be invoked "in the present emergency". Despite heavy domestic opposition, the law was passed due to strong pressure from the military and took effect from May 1938. It was abolished on 20 December 1945 by the American occupation authorities after the surrender of Japan.

The National Service Draft Ordinance was a supplemental law promulgated by Prime Minister Konoe as part of the State General Mobilization Law. It empowered the government to draft civilian workers to ensure an adequate supply of labor in strategic war industries, with exceptions allowed only in the case of the physically or mentally disabled.

The program was organized under the Ministry of Welfare, and at its peak 1,600,000 men and women were drafted, and 4,500,000 workers were reclassified as draftees (and thus were unable to quit their jobs). The Ordinance was superseded by the National Labor Service Mobilization Ordinance in March 1945, which was in turn abolished on 20 December 1945 by the Supreme Commander of the Allied Powers after the surrender of Japan.

== Effects ==
As a result of the enforcement of the law, and as Japan mobilized during the Pacific War, consumer expenditures fell from 26.7 billion yen in 1940 to 23.8 billion yen in 1942. As Japan entered a state of economic total war following defeats at the Battle of Midway and failure for the Germans to defeat the Soviet Union on the Eastern Front, capital outlays related to the military doubled from 9.9 billion yen in 1922 to 20.2 billion yen in 1944. Capital outlays related to non military industries decreased to half a billion yen a year, and consumer expenditures declined 30%.

The law included provisions to control capital, imposing significant limitations on the size of shareholder dividends and restructuring corporations in order to support the desires of employees. Such provisions were included in order to increase worker productivity as a way of furthering armaments production. Additional ordinances had long term effects in the Japanese economy, resulting in policies such as Shūshin koyō (lifetime employment), and the implementation of the "seniority wage".

Despite the dramatic increase in armaments production caused by Japan's shift to total mobilization between 1938 and 1942, Japanese munitions production remained far below that of the United States. Japanese aircraft production reached 28,000 in 1944, still only one fourth of the United States' output that year. The difference in shipyard production was even more vast, with Japanese shipbuilding remaining 1/6th of that of the United States.

== See also ==
- National Spiritual Mobilization Movement

== Bibliography ==
=== Books ===
- Pauer, Erich (1999). Japan's War Economy. Routledge. ISBN 0-415-15472-3.
- Sims, Richard (2001). Japanese Political History Since the Meiji Renovation 1868-2000. C. Hurst & Co. ISBN 9781850654520.
- Giffard, Sydney (1997). Japan Among the Powers, 1890-1990. Yale University Press. ISBN 9780300068917.

=== Journals ===
- Cohen, Jerome (1946). "The Japanese War Economy: 1940-1945". Far Eastern Survey. 15 (24): 361–370. doi:10.2307/3021956. JSTOR 3021956.
- Noguchi, Yukio (1998). "The 1940 System: Japan under the Wartime Economy". The American Economic Review.
- Nagahara, Yasuo (1938). "Manchukuo's New Economic Policy". Pacific Affairs. 11 (3): 323–337. doi:10.2307/2750925. JSTOR 2750925.
- Goldsmith, Raymond (1946). "The Power of Victory: Munitions Output in World War II". Military Affairs. doi:10.2307/1983105. JSTOR 1983105.
