= Nissan Group =

Japanese conglomerate

- Native name: 日産コンツェルン
- Romanized name: Nissan Kontserun
- Company type: Public
- Industry: Conglomerate
- Founded: 1920
- Founder: Yoshisuke Aikawa
- Defunct: 1947
- Fate: Reformed as Nissan Motor
- Successors: Nissan Motor; Hitachi; Eneos Holdings; Bussan Real Estate; Nissan Chemical; NOF Corporation
- Headquarters: Chiyoda, Tokyo, Japan
- Area served: Worldwide
- Products: Industrial machinery, telecommunications, power plants, information systems, electronics, automotive, materials, financial services, construction

Nissan Group (日産コンツェルン, Nissan Kontserun; "Nissan Concern"), formerly Nissan zaibatsu, was a group of companies and Japan's most powerful business groupings.

Founded in 1928 by Yoshisuke Aikawa, the group was originally a holding company created as an offshoot of Kuhara Mining Co. (became Nippon Mining & Metals Company; currently part of Eneos Holdings), which Aikawa had taken over as president from his brother-in-law, Fusanosuke Kuhara. After the bankruptcy of the Kuhara zaibatsu following World War I, Aikawa reorganized its assets into Japan Industries or Nihon Sangyo Corporation (日本産業株式会社, Nihon Sangyō kabushiki gaisha), Nissan for short.

The group's core business was real estate and insurance, with hundreds of member companies, including fisheries, mining companies, and was affiliated with Hitachi, as well as what Nissan is now known for—its automobile business. After World War II, the zaibatsu was disbanded and reformed into Nissan Motor Co.

== Companies ==
- Nissan group
  - 日産自動車 Nissan Motor
  - 日産化学工業 Nissan Chemical Corporation
  - 日産証券 Nissan Securities
  - 日産農林 NNK
  - Kinugawa Rubber Industrial Company
  - Kayaba Industry
- Hitachi
  - INES Corporation
  - Hitachi Maxell
  - Nisseicom Limited
  - 日立キャピタル株式会社 Hitachi Capital
  - 日立金属 Hitachi Metals
  - Hitachi Cable
  - 日立化成工業株式会社 Hitachi Chemical
    - 新神戸電機株式会社 Shin-Kobe Electric Machinery Company
  - 株式会社ニチレイ Nichirei Corporation
  - Hitachi Zosen Corporation
  - 日立建機株式会社 Hitachi Construction Machinery
    - TCM株式会社 TCM Corp
  - Nippon Suisan Kaisha
  - 日油株式会社 NOF Corporation
    - ニッサン石鹸株式会社 Nissan Soap Company
    - 昭和炭酸株式会社 Showa Tansan Company, Limited
  - りんかい日産建設 Rinkai Nissan Construction
- JXTG Group
  - JXTGホールディングス株式会社 JXTG Holdings Incorporated
    - JXTG Nippon Oil & Energy
    - JX金属株式会社 JX Nippon Mining & Metals Company
- Sompo Holdings (formerly Yasuda Fire & Marine Insurance Company)
  - Sompo Japan Nipponkoa Insurance
    - 日産センチュリー証券 Nissan Century Security Company, Limited
    - 兼松日産農林株式会社 Kanematsu-NNK Corporation

=== Former members ===
- Victor Company of Japan or JVC, sold to Panasonic in 1953, spun-off as an independent; merged into Kenwood Corporation to create JVCKenwood Corp.
- Nippon Columbia — founded in 1910 and divested from Nissan Group in 2002
- Denon — founded 1910 and merged with Marantz Japan Incorporated in 2002 to form D&M Holdings
- Nissan Mutual Life Insurance — founded in 1909 and bankrupt in 1997
- Nitto Denko — founded 1918
- Nissan Diesel — sold to Volvo in 2010 then sold to Isuzu since 2021
- Nissan Marine (Merged into Tohatsu in 2014)
- Nissan Outboard Motors (Merged into Tohatsu in 2014)

== See also ==
- Yasuda zaibatsu
