= Nisan (disambiguation) =

Nisan (or Nissan; Hebrew: נִיסָן, Standard Nīsan, Tiberian Nīsān; from Akkadian: 𒌗𒁈𒍠𒃻 Nisanu) in the Hebrew and Babylonian calendars is the month of the barley ripening and first month of spring.

Nisan may also refer to:

== Culture ==
- Nišan - in Islamic sepulchral culture in Serbo-Croatian nišan is a Muslim tombstone (from Ottoman Turkish نشان (nişan), from Persian نشان (nešân))

== Given name ==
=== Hebrew given name ===
- Nisan Stewart
- Nisan Bak
- Nisan Nativ
- Nisan Danon
- Nisan Katz

=== Turkish given name ===
- Nişan Şirinyan, Turkish Armenian actor
- Nişan Yaubyan, Turkish-Armenian architect and lecturer.

=== Other ===
- Nisan (Nishan), the character from Manchu folklore, Tale of the Nisan Shaman

== Surname ==
- Noam Nisan
- Mordechai Nisan
- Bella Nisan

== Other ==
- Nisan language

== See also ==
- Nissan (disambiguation)
- Nishan (disambiguation)
