= Nissan Outboard Motors =

Nissan outboard motors are produced by Tohatsu Corporation of Tokyo, Japan. They are the second largest producer of outboard motors in the world and produce environmentally conscious TLDI series of two-stroke low pressure direct injection outboards that meet current United States Environmental Protection Agency regulations for the US. All Nissan outboard engines in the US and Canada are Tohatsu's with a Nissan decal.

== See also ==
- Tohatsu outboards
