= Fusanosuke Kuhara =

Japanese businessman (d. 1965)

- 久原 房之助
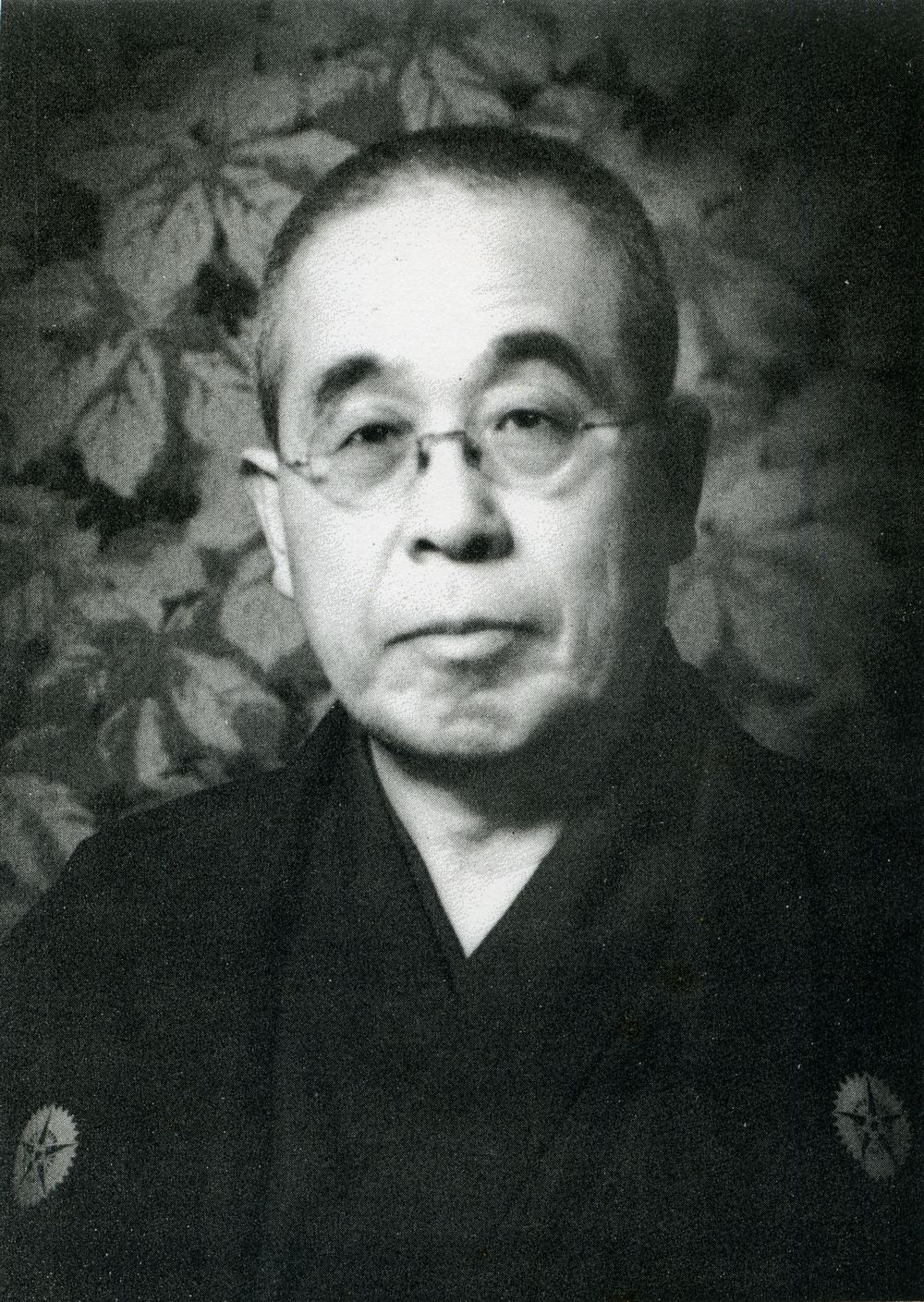
- Kuhara in 1939

Minister of Communications
- In office 23 May 1928 – 2 July 1929
- Prime Minister: Tanaka Giichi
- Preceded by: Mochizuki Keisuke
- Succeeded by: Koizumi Matajirō

Member of the House of Representatives
- In office 1 October 1952 – 14 March 1953
- Preceded by: Gyōhei Tanaka
- Succeeded by: Hideo Ishimura
- Constituency: Yamaguchi 2nd
- In office 20 February 1928 – 31 March 1937
- Preceded by: Constituency established
- Succeeded by: Sakuo Aoki
- Constituency: Yamaguchi 1st

Personal details
- Born: 12 July 1869 Hagi, Yamaguchi, Japan
- Died: 29 January 1965 (aged 95) Minato, Tokyo, Japan
- Party: Rikken Seiyūkai
- Other political affiliations: Independent (1952–1953)
- Education: Tokyo University of Commerce; Keio University

Fusanosuke Kuhara (久原 房之助, Kuhara Fusanosuke; 12 July 1869 – 29 January 1965) was a Japanese entrepreneur, politician and cabinet minister in the pre-war Empire of Japan.

== Biography ==
Kuhara was born in Hagi, Yamaguchi Prefecture into a family of sake brewers. His brother was the founder of Nippon Suisan Kaisha and his uncle Fujita Densaburō was the founder of the Fujita zaibatsu. He studied in 1885 at the Tokyo Commercial School (the predecessor of Hitotsubashi University) and went on to graduate from Keio University. After graduation, he joined the Morimura-gumi, but on the recommendation of ex-Chōshū politicians Inoue Kaoru, he joined his uncle’s company, the Fujita-gumi (current Dowa Holdings), and in 1891 was assigned management of the Kosaka mine in Kosaka, Akita, one of the largest lead, copper and zinc mines in Japan. He introduced new technologies and made the mine very profitable.

In 1903, he left the Fujita-gumi, and acquired the Akazawa Copper Mine in Ibaraki Prefecture in 1905, renaming it the Hitachi Copper Mine. He established Hitachi Seisakusho in 1910, merging his operations into Kuhara Kōgyō in 1912. The mine became the second largest producer of copper in Japan in 1914 through mechanization and improved production techniques.

During World War I, Kuhara expanded his operations into a vast array of enterprises, ranging from shipbuilding to fertilizer production, petrochemical, life insurance, trading and shipping, creating the Kuhara zaibatsu. However, the overextended company experienced severe financial difficulties in the post-war depression, and Kuhara turned to his brother-in-law, Yoshisuke Aikawa, who created a holding company called Nihon Sangyō, or Nissan for short. Kuhara went on to a career in politics, forging ties with future Prime Minister Giichi Tanaka and other political and military leaders, which Aikawa would later use to his advantage.

In 1928, Kuhara was elected to the lower house of the Diet of Japan as a member of the Rikken Seiyūkai from the Yamaguchi 1st Electoral District, and was made Minister of Communications the same year in the Tanaka administration

He served as secretary-general of the Rikken Seiyūkai in 1931 under Inukai Tsuyoshi. Politically, Kuhara supported a hard-line approach against China, and was a vocal supporter of a constitutional reform intended to transform Japan into a one-party state. However, Kuhara was briefly arrested after the February 26 incident and forced to resign from the party after it was discovered that he had made a financial contribution to the rebels.

After the Rikken Seiyūkai party split, Kuhara was invited back into politics by Ichirō Hatoyama, leading the faction opposed to Chikuhei Nakajima, and rising to the post of president of the party in 1939.

In 1940, he presided over the absorption of the party into Fumimaro Konoe’s Taisei Yokusankai, thus fulfilling his ambition of creating a one-party state. Under the Hiranuma administration, he served as an advisor to the cabinet. He was one of the key organizers of the League of Diet Members Carry Through the Holy War.

After World War II, Kuhara was purged by the American occupation authorities. After the end of the occupation, he was elected to the post-war House of Representatives of Japan from the Yamaguchi 2nd Electoral District in the 1952 General Election. He played an important role in the restoration of Russo-Japanese relations and Sino-Japanese relations.

Kuhara died at his home in Shirokanedai, Minato, Tokyo in January 1965. His home is now the Happo-en, a hotel with a noted Japanese garden.

== Residence and Bridge ==
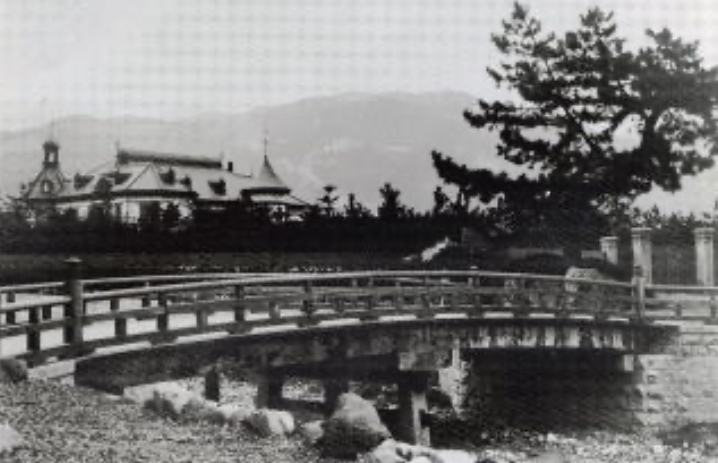
Residence and Bridge of Fusanosuke Kuhara

One of his residences in Sumiyoshi, Kobe (near Sumiyoshi Station), had a hospital, electric power plant and the custom-made air-conditioning tunnel from Mount Rokkō for itself in the era without air conditioning. He was also running true locomotives in the garden for his children.

Political offices
Preceded by Mochizuki Keisuke	Minister of Communications; May 1928 – July 1929	Succeeded by Matajirō Koizumi
