= Outboard motor =

Self-contained propulsion system for boats

Basic parts of an outboard motor

An outboard motor is a propulsion system for boats, consisting of a self-contained unit that includes engine, gearbox and propeller or jet drive, designed to be affixed to the outside of the transom. They are the most common motorised method of propelling small watercraft. As well as providing propulsion, outboards provide steering control, as they are designed to pivot over their mountings and thus control the direction of thrust. The skeg also acts as a rudder when the engine is not running. Unlike inboard motors, outboard motors can be easily removed for storage or repairs.

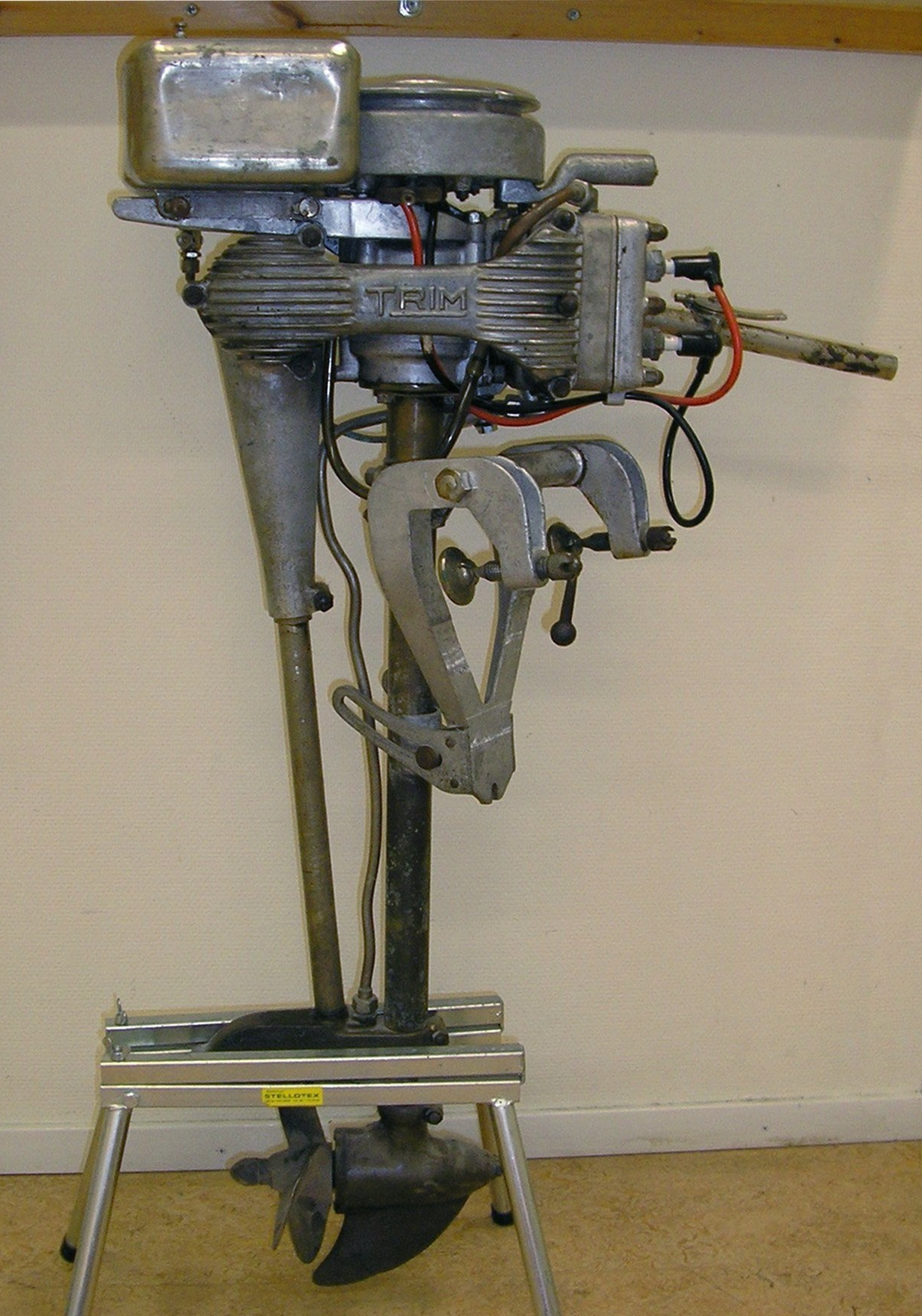
Bolinder's two-cylinder Trim outboard engine

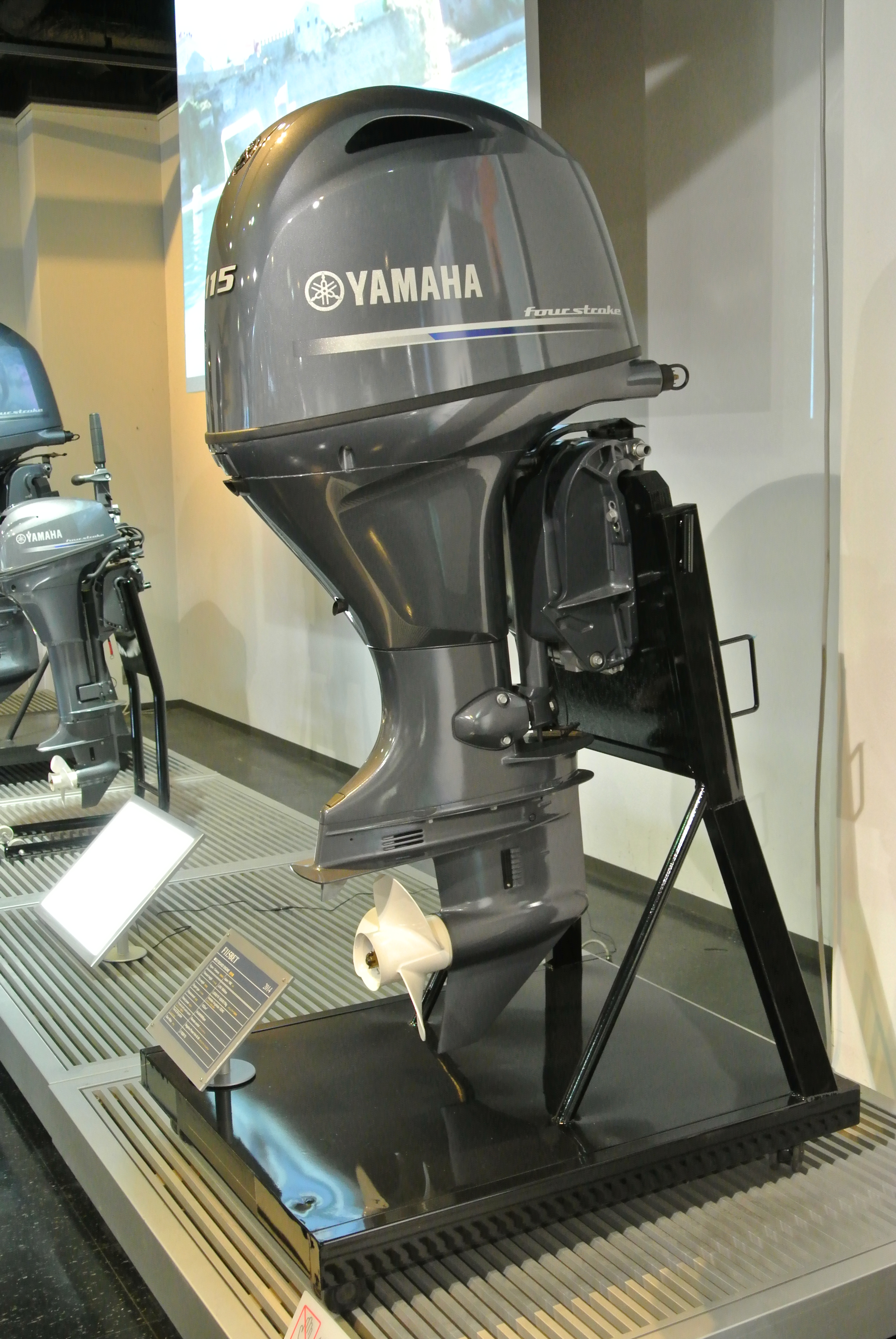
A Yamaha F115BET outboard engine, the world's largest outboard motor manufacturer

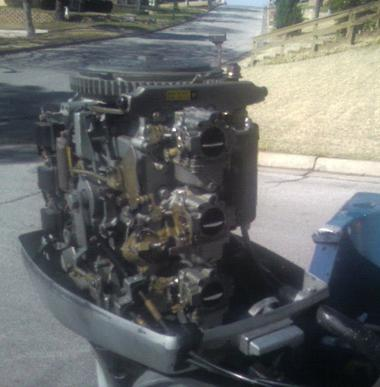
1979 Evinrude 70 hp outboard, cowling and air silencer removed, exposing its shift/throttle/spark advance linkages, flywheel, and three carburetors

In order to eliminate the chances of hitting bottom with an outboard motor, the motor can be tilted up to an elevated position either electronically or manually. This helps when traveling through shallow waters where there may be debris that could potentially damage the motor as well as the propeller. If the electric motor required to move the pistons which raise or lower the engine is malfunctioning, every outboard motor is equipped with a manual piston release which will allow the operator to drop the motor down to its lowest setting.

== Advantages and disadvantages ==
Large ships, boats and yachts will inevitably have inboard engines. Medium size vessels may have either inboards or outboards, and small vessels rarely have inboard motors. If one has a choice, these factors should be noted:

- Inboard engines are almost invariable diesel, allowing ruggedness, reliability and fuel economy. The very few outboards that are diesels tend to be large heavy items, suitable for workboats and very large RIBs. Diesel outboards are rarely found on leisure craft.
- Outboards may be easily removed from the vessel for safe-keeping and servicing. They are also vulnerable to theft (a risk rarely suffered by inboard engines).
- Outboards are cheaper and lighter than inboards. They are often fitted to cruising yachts. Cruising catamarans up to around 10 metres LOA frequently have a petrol longshaft engine with a propeller that is larger and slower-turning than other types.
- Catamarans that have an engine for each hull (to aid manoeverability) tend to have twin inboards, as twin outboards might interfere with rudder arrangements.
- While inboards may be mounted in a optimum position for balance, outboards must be mounted on (or shortly ahead of) the transom. This means that a significant weight is at the aft end of the boat, and this must be taken into consideration.

== General use ==
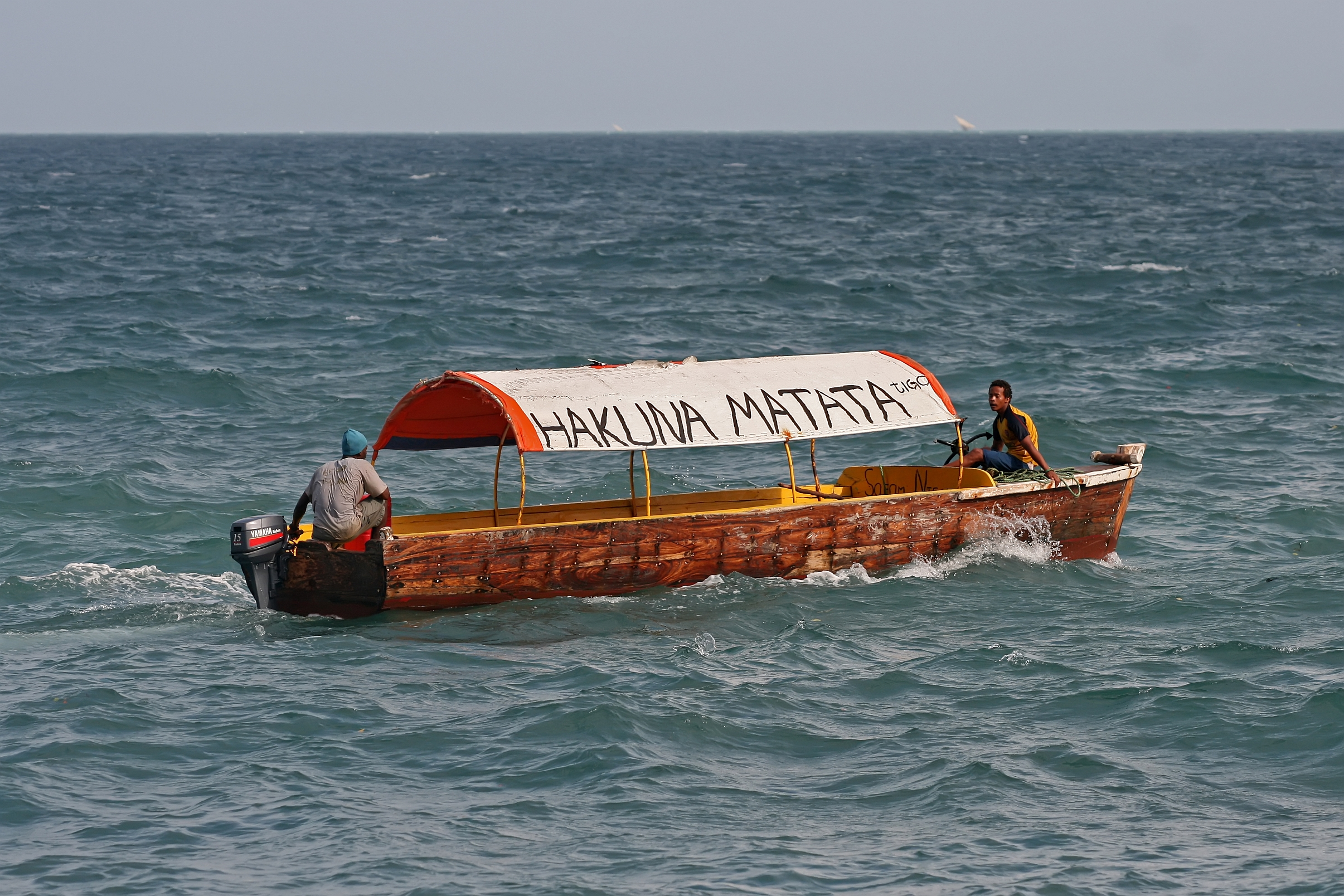
An open seagoing boat with an outboard motor attached

=== Large outboards ===
Large outboards are affixed to the transom using clamps and are either tiller steered or controlled from the helm. Generally motors of 100 hp plus are linked to controls at the helm. These range from 2-, 3-, and 4-cylinder models generating 15 to 135 horsepower (11 to 101 kW) suitable for hulls up to 17 feet (5.2 m) in length to powerful V6 and V8 cylinder blocks rated up to 627 hp (468 kW)., with sufficient power to be used on boats of 37 feet (11 m) or longer.

=== Portable ===
Small outboard motors, up to 15 horsepower (11 kW) or so, are easily portable. They are affixed to the boat via clamps and thus easily moved from boat to boat. These motors typically use a manual start system, with throttle and gearshift controls mounted on the body of the motor, and a tiller for steering. The smallest of these weigh as little as 12 kilograms (26 lb), have integral fuel tanks, and provide sufficient power to move a small dinghy at around 8 knots (15 km/h; 9.2 mph) This type of motor is typically used:

- to power small craft such as johnboats, dinghies, canoes, etc
- to provide auxiliary power for sailboats
- for trolling aboard larger craft, as small outboards are typically more efficient at trolling speeds. In this application, the motor is frequently installed on the transom alongside and connected to the primary outboard to enable helm steering. In addition many small motor manufacturers have begun offering variants with power trim/tilt and electric starting functions so that they may be completely controlled remotely

=== Electric-powered ===
Electric outboard motors are self-contained propulsory units for boats, first invented in 1973 by Morton Ray of Ray Electric Outboards. These are not to be confused with trolling motors, which are not designed as a primary source of power. Most electric outboard motors have 0.5- to 4-kilowatt direct-current (DC) electric motors, operated at 12 to 60 volts DC. Recently developed outboard motors are powered with an alternating current (AC) or DC electric motor in the power head like a conventional petrol engine. With this setup, a motor can produce 10 kW output or more and is able to replace a petrol engine of 15 HP or more. The advantage of the induction or asynchronous motor is the power transfer to the rotor by means of electromagnetic induction. As these engines do not use permanent magnets, they require less maintenance and develop more torque at lower propeller speeds.

=== Pump-jet ===
Pump-jet propulsion is available as an option on most outboard motors. Although less efficient than an open propeller, they are particularly useful in applications where the ability to operate in very shallow water is important. They also eliminate the laceration dangers of an open propeller.

=== Propane ===
Propane outboard motors are available from several manufacturers. These products have several advantages such as lower emissions, absence of ethanol-related issues, and no need for choke once the system is pressurized. Lehr is regarded as the first manufacturer to have brought a propane-powered outboard motor to market by Popular Mechanics and other boating publications.

== History and developments ==
The first known outboard motor was a small 11 pound (5 kg) electric unit designed around 1870 by Gustave Trouvé, and patented in May 1880 (Patent N° 136,560). Later about 25 petrol powered outboards may have been produced in 1896 by American Motors Co—but neither of these two pioneering efforts appear to have had much impact.

The Waterman outboard engine appears to be the first gasoline-powered outboard offered for sale in significant numbers. It was developed from 1903 in Grosse Ile, Michigan, with a patent application filed in 1905 Starting in 1906, the company went on to make thousands of his "Porto-Motor" units, claiming 25,000 sales by 1914. The inboard boat motor firm of Caille Motor Company of Detroit were instrumental in making the cylinder and engines.

The most successful early outboard motor, was created by Norwegian-American inventor Ole Evinrude in 1909. Historically, a majority of outboards have been two-stroke powerheads fitted with a carburetor due to the design's inherent simplicity, reliability, low cost and light weight. Drawbacks include increased pollution, due to the high volume of unburned gasoline and oil in their exhaust, and louder noise.

=== Four-stroke outboards ===
Four-stroke outboards have been sold since the late 1920s, such as the Roness and Sharland. In 1962 Homelite introduced a four-stroke outboard a 55-horsepower (41 kW) motor, based on the four-cylinder Crosley automobile engine. This outboard was called the Bearcat and was later purchased by Fischer-Pierce, the makers of Boston Whaler, for use in their boats because of their advantages over two-stroke engines. In 1964, Honda Motor Co. introduced its first four-stroke powerhead. In 1984, Yamaha introduced their first four-stroke outboards, which were only available in the low-power range. In 1990 Honda released 35 hp and 45 hp four-stroke models. They continued to lead in the development of four-stroke engines throughout the 1990s as US and European exhaust emissions regulations such as CARB (California Air Resources Board) led to the proliferation of four-stroke outboards. At first, North American manufacturers such as Mercury and OMC used engine technology from Japanese manufacturers such as Yamaha and Suzuki until they were able to develop their own four-stroke engine. The inherent advantages of four-stroke motors included: lower pollution (especially oil in the water), noise reduction, increased fuel economy, and increased torque at low engine speeds.

Honda Marine Group, Mercury Marine, Mercury Racing, Nissan Marine, Suzuki Marine, Tohatsu Outboards, Yamaha Marine, and China Oshen-Hyfong marine have all developed new four-stroke engines. Some are carburetted, usually the smaller engines. The balance are electronically fuel-injected. Depending on the manufacturer, newer engines benefit from advanced technology such as multiple valves per cylinder, variable camshaft timing (Honda's VTEC), boosted low end torque (Honda's BLAST), 3-way cooling systems, and closed loop fuel injection. Mercury Verado four-strokes are unique in that they are supercharged.

Mercury Marine, Mercury Racing, Tohatsu, Yamaha Marine, Nissan and Evinrude each developed computer-controlled direct-injected two-stroke engines. Each brand has a different method of DI.

Fuel economy on both direct-injected and four-stroke outboards measures from a 10 percent to 80 percent improvement compared with conventional two-strokes.

However, the gap between two-stroke and four-stroke outboard fuel economy is beginning to narrow. Two-stroke outboard motor manufacturers have recently introduced technologies that help to improve two-stroke fuel economy.

=== LPG outboards ===
In 2012, Lehr inc. introduced some small (<5 hp) outboards based on modified Chinese petrol engines to run on propane gas. Tohatsu currently also produces propane powered models, all rated 5 hp. Conversion of larger outboards to run on Liquified petroleum gas is considered unusual and exotic although some hobbyists continue to experiment.

== Outboard motor selection ==
It is important to select a motor that is a good match for the hull in terms of power and shaft length.

=== Power requirements ===
Whether using a displacement or planing vessel, one should select an appropriate power level; too much power is wasteful (adding unnecessary weight), and may often be dangerous. Boats built in the US have Coast Guard Rating Plates, which specify the maximum recommended engine powers for the hulls. In the United Kingdom, boats have CE plates on the transoms which specify maximum engine power, shaft length, maximum engine weight and maximum number of persons or maximum load.

=== Shaft length ===
Outboard motor shaft lengths are standardized to fit 15-, 20- and 25-inch (38-, 51- and 64-centimeter) transoms. If the shaft is too long it will extend farther into the water than necessary creating drag, which will impair performance and fuel economy. If the shaft is too short, the motor will be prone to ventilation. Even worse, if the water intake ports on the lower unit are not sufficiently submerged, engine overheating is likely, which can result in severe damage.

=== General dimensions ===
Different outboard engine brands require different transom dimensions and sizes. This affects performance and trim.

Outboard brand	Model	Transom angle	Max transom thickness	Transom to bulkhead
Yamaha	F350	12°		712 mm
Yamaha	F300	12°		712 mm
EVINRUDE	DE 300	14°	68.58 mm	
EVINRUDE	G2 300 HP	14°		
SUZUKI	DF 300 AP	14°	81 mm	
MERCURY	300 HP	14°		
LEHR	5.0HP	14°		
LEHR	2.5HP	14°		

== Operational considerations ==
=== Motor mounting height ===
Motor height on the transom is an important factor in achieving optimal performance. The motor should be as high as possible without ventilating or loss of water pressure. This minimizes the effect of hydrodynamic drag while underway, allowing for greater speed. Generally, the antiventilation plate should be about the same height as, or up to two inches higher than, the keel, with the motor in neutral trim.

=== Trim ===
Trim is the angle of the motor in relation to the hull, as illustrated below. The ideal trim angle is the one in which the boat rides level, with most of the hull on the surface instead of plowing through the water.
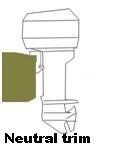
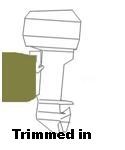
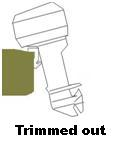
If the motor is trimmed out too far, the bow will ride too high in the water. With too little trim, the bow rides too low. The optimal trim setting will vary depending on many factors including speed, hull design, weight and balance, and conditions on the water (wind and waves). Many large outboards are equipped with power trim, an electric motor on the mounting bracket, with a switch at the helm that enables the operator to adjust the trim angle on the fly. In this case, the motor should be trimmed fully in to start, and trimmed out (with an eye on the tachometer) as the boat gains momentum, until it reaches the point just before ventilation begins or further trim adjustment results in an increase in engine speed with no increase in travel speed. Motors not equipped with power trim are manually adjustable using a pin called a topper tilt lock.

=== Ventilation ===
Ventilation is a phenomenon that occurs when surface air or exhaust gas (in the case of motors equipped with through-hub exhaust) is drawn into the spinning propeller blades. With the propeller pushing mostly air instead of water, the load on the engine is greatly reduced, causing the engine to race and the propeller to spin fast enough to result in cavitation, at which point little thrust is generated at all. The condition continues until the prop slows enough for the air bubbles to rise to the surface. The primary causes of ventilation are: motor mounted too high, motor trimmed out excessively, damage to the antiventilation plate, damage to propeller, foreign object lodged in the diffuser ring.

=== Safety ===
If the helmsman goes overboard, the boat may continue under power but uncontrolled, risking serious or fatal injuries to the helmsman and others in the water. A safety measure is a "kill cord" attached to the boat and helmsman, which cuts the motor if the helmsman falls overboard.

=== Cooling system ===
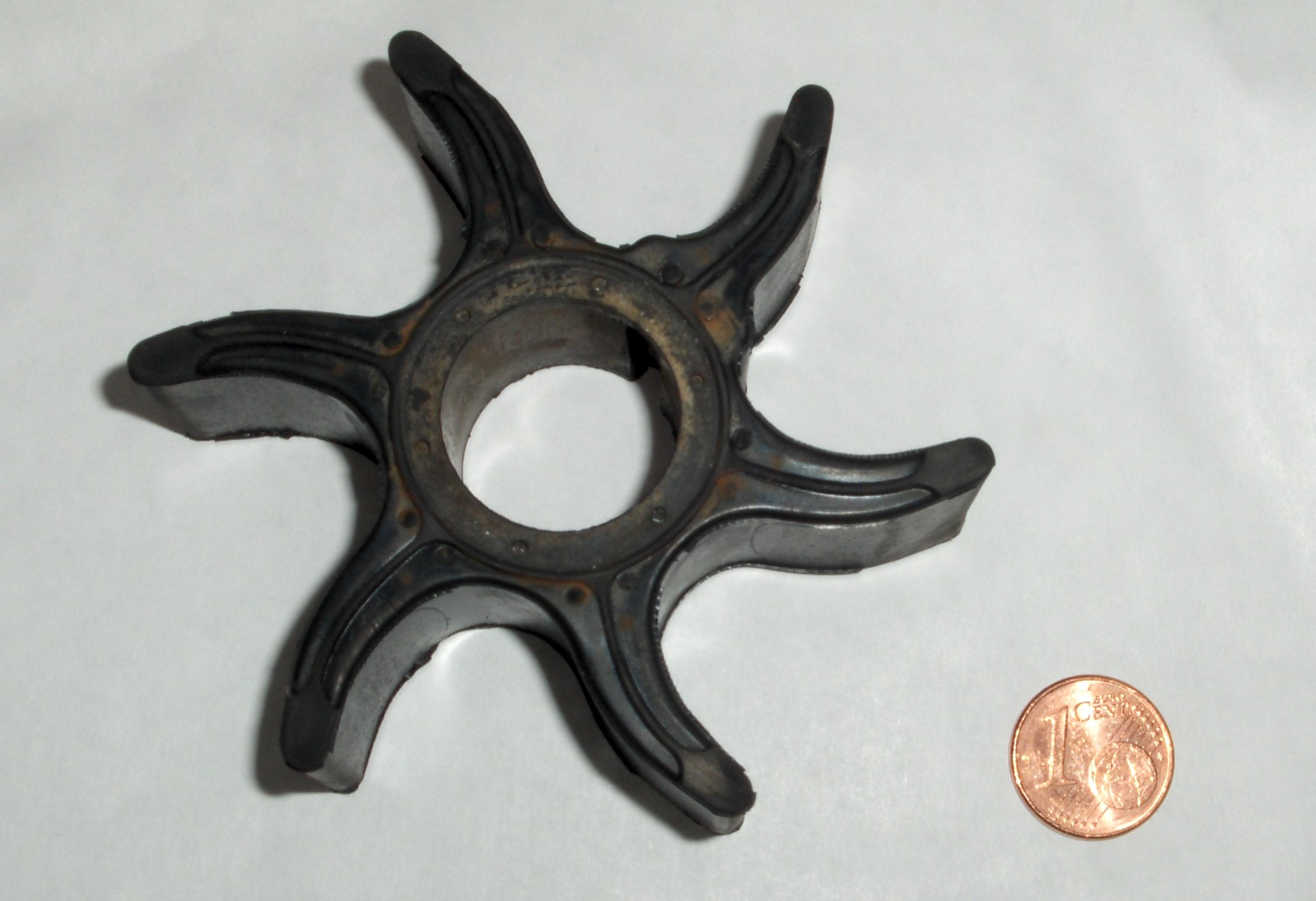
Rotor of the impeller pump (cooling system) of an outboard motor

The most common type of cooling used on outboards of all eras use a rubber impeller to pump water from below the waterline up into the engine. This design has remained the standard due mainly to the efficiency and simplicity of its design. One disadvantage to this system is that if the impeller is run dry for a length of time (such as leaving the engine running when pulling the boat out of the water or in some cases tilting the engine out of the water while running), the impeller is likely to be ruined in the process.

==== Air-cooled outboards ====
Air-cooled outboard engines are currently produced by some manufacturers. These tend to be small engines of less than 5 horsepower (3.7 kW). Outboard engines made by Briggs & Stratton are air-cooled.

==== Closed-loop cooling ====
Outboards manufactured by Seven Marine use a closed-loop cooling system with a heat exchanger. This means saltwater is not pumped through the engine block, as is the case with most outboard motors, but instead engine coolant and outside water are pumped through (opposite sides of) the heat exchanger.

=== Engine Stalls ===
An outboard engine may stall if it does not have the correct inputs. Common problems that lead to stalling are electrical issues, low quality fuel or clogged fuel filer. Other issues may include a damaged carburetor oil switch.

== Use in long-tail boats ==
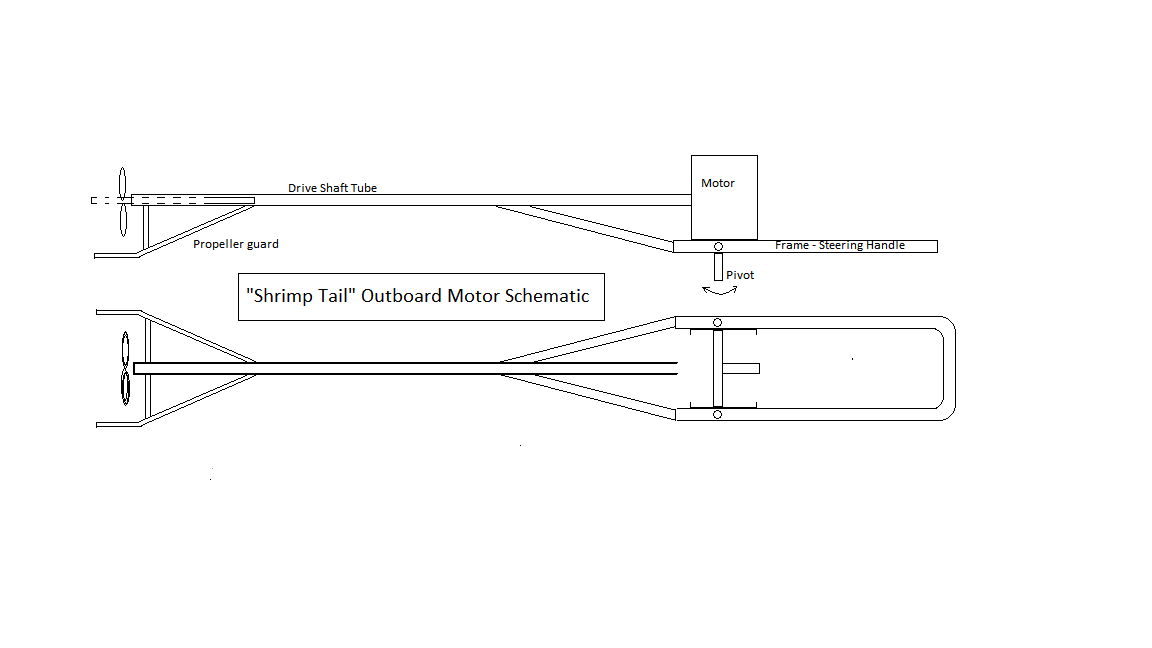
Vietnamese-style "shrimp tail outboard motor" schematic

In Vietnam and other parts of southeast Asia long-tail boats use outboard motors altered to extend their propellers far from the rest of the motor. In Vietnam these outboards are called máy đuôi tôm (shrimp tail motor), which are smallish air-cooled or water-cooled gasoline, diesel or even modified automotive engines bolted to a welded steel tube frame, with another long steel tube up to 3 m long to hold an extended drive shaft driving a conventional propeller. The frame that holds the motor has a short, swiveling steel pin/tube approximately 15 cm long underneath, to be inserted into a corresponding hole on the transom, or a solid block or wood purposely built-in thereof. This drop-in arrangement enables extremely quick transfer of the motor to another boat or for storage – all that is needed is to lift it out. The pivoting design allows the outboard motor to be swiveled by the operator in almost all directions: Sideways for direction, up and down to change the thrust line according to speed or bow lift, elevate completely out of water for easy starting, placing the drive shaft and the propeller forward along the side of the boat for reverse, or put them inside the boat for propeller replacement, which can be a regular occurrence to the cheap cast aluminum propellers on the often debris-prone inland waterways.

== Manufacturers ==
=== Global Brands ===
Rank	Country	Company	Logo	Website
1st	(Japan)	Yamaha Motor Company		global.yamaha-motor.com
2nd	(United States)	Mercury Marine (Brunswick Corporation)		www.brunswick.com
3rd	(Sweden)	Volvo Penta		www.volvopenta.com
4th	(Japan)	Suzuki		www.suzuki.co.jp
5th	(Japan)	Honda		global.honda/jp/

=== List of Manufacturers ===
- Aquawatt Electric Outboard Motor
- Bolinder
- Briggs & Stratton - USA - Up to 5 hp
- Cimco Marine AB
- DBD Marine
- EP Carry
- ePropulsion - Hong Kong
- Halmarine Outboards
- Hidea - China
- Honda Marine Group - Japan - Up to 350 hp
- KARVIN motors - electric outboard
- Kohler Company
- Jarvis Marine
- Lehr
- Maxus outboards
- Mud-skipper Longtail outboard
- Mercury/Mariner/Mercury Racing - USA - Up to 600 hp
- Nissan Marine (now Tohatsu)
- Oshen-Hyfong Marine
- Photon Marine Electric Outboard Motors for Commercial Boat Fleets
- Propel part of Saietta Group - Electric outboards
- Parsun - China
- Selva Marine - Italy - Up to 250 hp
- Suzuki Marine - Japan - Up to 350 hp
- Tohatsu - Japan
- Torqeedo part of Deutz AG - Electric outboards
- Zomair
- Ul'yanovsk Motor Plant
- West Bend
- Yamaha Outboards - Japan - Up to 450 hp
- Yanmar Diesel

==== Electric outboard manufacturers ====
- Minn Kota
- Torqeedo
- Elco Motors
- Thrustme
- Flux Marine
- Rim Drive Technology
- TEMO
- ePropulsion

==== Former manufacturers ====
- British Anzani
- British Seagull (defunct)
- Chrysler
- Homelite
- Johnson Outboards (folded into Evinrude Outboard Motors)
- ELTO
- Evinrude, a division of Bombardier Recreational Products - USA - Up to 300 hp
- McCulloch
- Seven Marine - USA - 3 models rated up to 627 hp utilising a General Motors sourced V8 supercharged power-plant
- Tomos
- Volvo Penta
- Oliver

== See also ==
- Yacht tender – Boat used for servicing larger racing or cruising pleasure craft
- Pneumatic motor – Compressed-air engine
- Sterndrive, also known as Inboard/outboard drive – Type of boat engine

== Patents ==
- U.S. patent 1,001,260 - Marine propulsion mechanism
- U.S. patent 1,011,930 - Canoe and other small craft
