= Dowa Automobile Company =

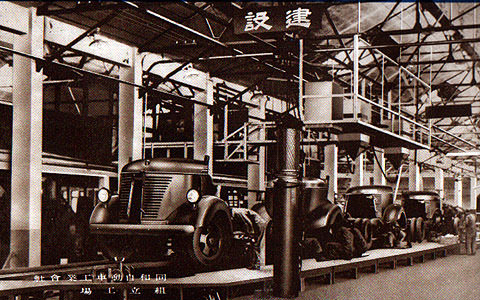
Factory of Dōwa Automotive Industries

Dōwa Automotive Industries Co Ltd (traditional Chinese/Kyūjitai: 同和自動車工業株式會社; Shinjitai: 同和自動車工業株式会社; Hanyu Pinyin: Tónghé Zìdòngchē Gōngyè Zhūshì Huìshè; Wade–Giles: T'ung-ho Tzu-tung-ch'e Kung-ye Chu-shih Hui-she Japanese Hepburn: Dōwa Jidōsha Kōgyō kabushiki kaisha) was a Manchukuo-based manufacturer of automobiles, trucks and armored cars. Its head office was in Mukden, the largest city of Manchukuo.

== History ==
Founded on March 26, 1934, Dōwa Automotive was a joint venture of the South Manchurian Railway Company, the government of Manchukuo, and 7 Japanese companies. Following World War I, the Imperial Japanese Army saw the need for increased mechanization, and the Kwantung Army began to import foreign-built vehicles, including the Model 25 Vickers Crossley Armored Car. After the formation of the Empire of Manchukuo, the Kwantung Army's economic policy of self-sufficiency in major strategic heavy industry spurred the need for locally-built trucks and automobiles. Dōwa began with the assistance of Tōkyō Jidōsha Kogyo (the forerunner of Isuzu) to build vehicles from knock-down kits, as the infrastructure of sub-suppliers was gradually increased to permit more and more local content. Initial production was estimated at 5000 vehicles per year, many of which were copies of the Crossley design.

Dōwa Automotive was absorbed into the new Manchurian Automotive Production Company (満州自動車製造株式会社, Manshū Jidōsha Seizō Kabushiki Kaisha), a state combine and subsidiary of the Manchurian Heavy Industries in 1940.
