= Suzuki Marine =

- Type: Subsidiary
- Founded: 1909 in Hamamatsu, Shizuoka Prefecture, Japan
- Founder: Michio Suzuki
- Products: Outboard motors
- Parent: Suzuki Motor Corporation
- Website: www.globalsuzuki.com/marine/

Suzuki Marine is an international company that designs and manufactures outboard motors. A subsidiary of the Japanese multinational motor corporation Suzuki, Suzuki Marine has locations in America, Asia, Europe, Africa and Oceania.

Founded by Japanese inventor Michio Suzuki in the city of Hamamatsu in 1909, the company has built engines, motorcycles, automobiles, ATVs and outboard motors, building their first outboard motor in 1965. The Suzuki Marine brand was formed in 1977 to market outboard motors exclusively to the U.S., and currently has factories and distributors in several countries. In 2017 the Suzuki Motor Corporation was the fourth largest automaker by volume in Japan.

== History ==
Michio Suzuki was born in Hamamatsu, Shizuoka Prefecture, Japan on February 10, 1887. While he worked as a young apprentice carpenter, the textile industry in the Enshu region where he lived was booming. Suzuki became an inventor and businessman, and began his career manufacturing looms. In 1909, he founded Suzuki Loom Works. In 1920, Suzuki established the Suzuki Looming Manufacturing Co. as a joint-stock company. The company successfully established itself as a supplier of looms in Japan's lucrative silk industry, but damage to factories sustained during the World War II and the collapse of the cotton industry in the 1950s prompted Suzuki to expand into other areas of manufacturing.

Several decades later the company manufactured its first automobile, as civilian passenger vehicles were deemed a non-essential commodity in Japan due to tough economic conditions following World War II. Suzuki began developing products that were specifically needed at the time. This led to the release of the company’s first motorised bicycle in 1952, entering them into the motor industry. This first motor formed the foundation of Suzuki’s future in designing engines. In January 1954, the company changed its name to Suzuki Motor Co., Ltd. A year later, the first Suzuki automobile, Suzulight, went on sale. In 1965, the company marketed their first Suzuki outboard motor, D55.

When the second outboard motor, DT5, was produced in 1977, the corporation marketed it in the U.S. under the new brand Suzuki Marine. In 1999 the company produced their first foreign-made outboard motor in Thailand by the Thai Suzuki Motor Company.

== Product ==
Suzuki Marine produces two-stroke and four-stroke outboard engines ranging from 2.5 horsepower to 350hp. Suzuki Marine outboard motors are manufactured at the Tokoyama facility in the Aichi prefecture of Japan, and in factories in several countries abroad.

After manufacturing their first outboard motor in 1965, the 5.5 horsepower D55, Suzuki continued producing outboard motors. in 1987, the two-stroke, V6 DT200 Exante engine won the company’s first accolade: the "Most Innovative Products" award from the National Marine Manufacturers Association (NMMA) of the U.S.

In 1994, Suzuki unveiled the first of their four-stroke outboard motors, the DF9.9 and DF15.. The company subsequently released the DF60 (which featured an electronic fuel injection system) in 1997, and the DF300 in 2006 being the industry’s first 300HP V6 4-stroke outboard. In 2017, Suzuki Marine debuted the DF350A outboard motor, under the slogan: “The Ultimate 4-Stroke Outboard”. The DF350A engine received the 2017 IBEX Innovation Award of the National Marine Manufacturers Association (NMMA).

Suzuki Marine’s current outboard motor designs incorporate technologies including:

- An offset driveshaft
- Variable valve timing (VVT)
- Direct air intake
- High energy rotation
- Multi-stage induction
- 2-stage gear reduction
- Lean burn control systems
- Battery-less electronic fuel injection
- Dual injector
- Self-adjusting timing chain
- Two-way water inlet
- Suzuki anti-corrosion finish
- Suzuki water detecting system
- Suzuki dual louver system
- Suzuki dual prop system
- Suzuki selective rotation
- Tilt limit system
- Suzuki precision control
- Quiet operation
- Suzuki troll mode system
- Keyless start system.

== Awards ==
Suzuki outboards have won several of the “Innovation Awards” awarded by the National Marine Manufacturers Association (NMMA). The NMMA is a trade association representing boat, marine engine and accessory manufacturers in the U.S. Listed below are the Suzuki outboard models that have won the "Innovation Award":

- 1987: DT200 Exanté
- 1997: DF60 and DF70
- 1998: DF40 and DF50
- 2003: DF250
- 2006: DF300
- 2011: DF40A and DF50A
- 2012: DF300AP
- 2014: DF30A and DF25A
- 2017: DF350A
