= Showa Steel Works =

Japanese steel mill

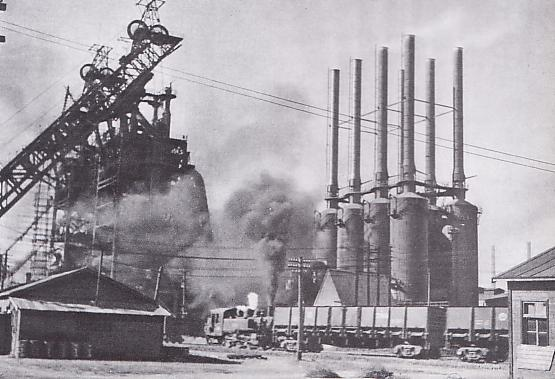
Shōwa Steel Works in early 1940s

The Shōwa Steel Works (昭和製鋼所, Shōwa Seikōsho) (Hanyu Pinyin: Zhāohé Zhìgāngsuǒ; Wade–Giles: Chao^{1}-ho^{2} Chih^{4}-kang^{1}-so^{3}) was a Japanese government-sponsored steel mill that was one of the showpieces of the industrialization program for Manchukuo in the late 1930s.

== History ==
Shōwa Steel Works began as the Anshan Iron & Steel Works, a subsidiary of the South Manchurian Railway Company in 1918. The city of Anshan in Liaoning was chosen for its proximity to the Takushan iron ore deposits and rail works at Mukden. The company used low grade iron; in 1934 it mined 950,000 tonnes. In 1933, after reorganization and expansion, it was renamed the Shōwa Steel Works.

Shōwa Steel produced pig iron and steel, and the steel mill was soon surrounded by a large industrial complex of other factories to produce a variety of metal products. Sumitomo Steel Pipe established a plant to produce steel pipes, and Manchurian Roll Manufacturing Company to produce steel mill rolls. To feed the furnaces, coal mines were established at Fushun, 35 kilometers to the east, which also led to electric power plants, coal liquefaction plants, cement works, brick kilns. By the end of the 1930s, there were over 780 Japanese industrial plants in Fengtian province.

In 1937, under the direction of the Kwantung Army, Japanese industrialist Yoshisuke Aikawa organized a holding company called the Manchurian Industrial Development Company ("Mangyō"), a Manchukuo zaibatsu with major shareholdings in the South Manchuria Railway, co-owned by Nissan and Manchukuo. The new zaibatsu invested heavily in Shōwa Steel, and took a controlling interest.

As part of the new business plan, Shōwa Steel licensed the Krupp-Renn process from German steel makers, and sent people to Nazi Germany for training from September 1937. Equipment received from Krupp was installed by 1939, greatly increasing production efficiencies.

Total production of processed iron in Manchuria reached 1,000,000 tonnes in 1931-32, of which almost half was made by Shōwa Steel; iron production grew to 7,000,000 of tonnes in 1938. In 1941, Shōwa Steel Works had a total capacity production of 1,750,000 tonnes of iron bars and 1,000,000 tonnes of processed steel. By 1942, Shōwa Steel Works total production capacity reached 3,600,000 tonnes, making it one of the major iron and steel centers in the world. By 1944, Shōwa Steel Works' production was integral to the Japanese empire as a whole, accounting for approximately 15% of pig iron and 6% of rolled steel production across all Japanese-held territory, including its home islands.

It was therefore of strategic importance in the Pacific War, and was subject to constant attack by B-29 Superfortress strategic bombers of the USAAF. Imperial Japanese Army detached the 1st Chutai (unit) of 104th Sentai (squadron) of the Imperial Japanese Army Air Force, to Anshan, with other air squadrons for industrial defense purposes. Although this unit was equipped with modern Nakajima Ki-84 Ia (Manshū Type) "Hayate" Frank fighters, manufactured by Manchuria Airplane Manufacturing Company, the plant suffered heavy damage from the air raids, losing up to 30% of its capacity.

Shōwa Steel Works used Chinese prisoners for forced labor; these forced laborers numbered more than 4,000 by early 1942.

In 1944, Manchukuo restructured the iron and steel industry of Manchuria, including combining Shōwa Steel Works with smaller enterprises. The new enterprise was directly supervised by the Manchukuo Ministry of Economy.

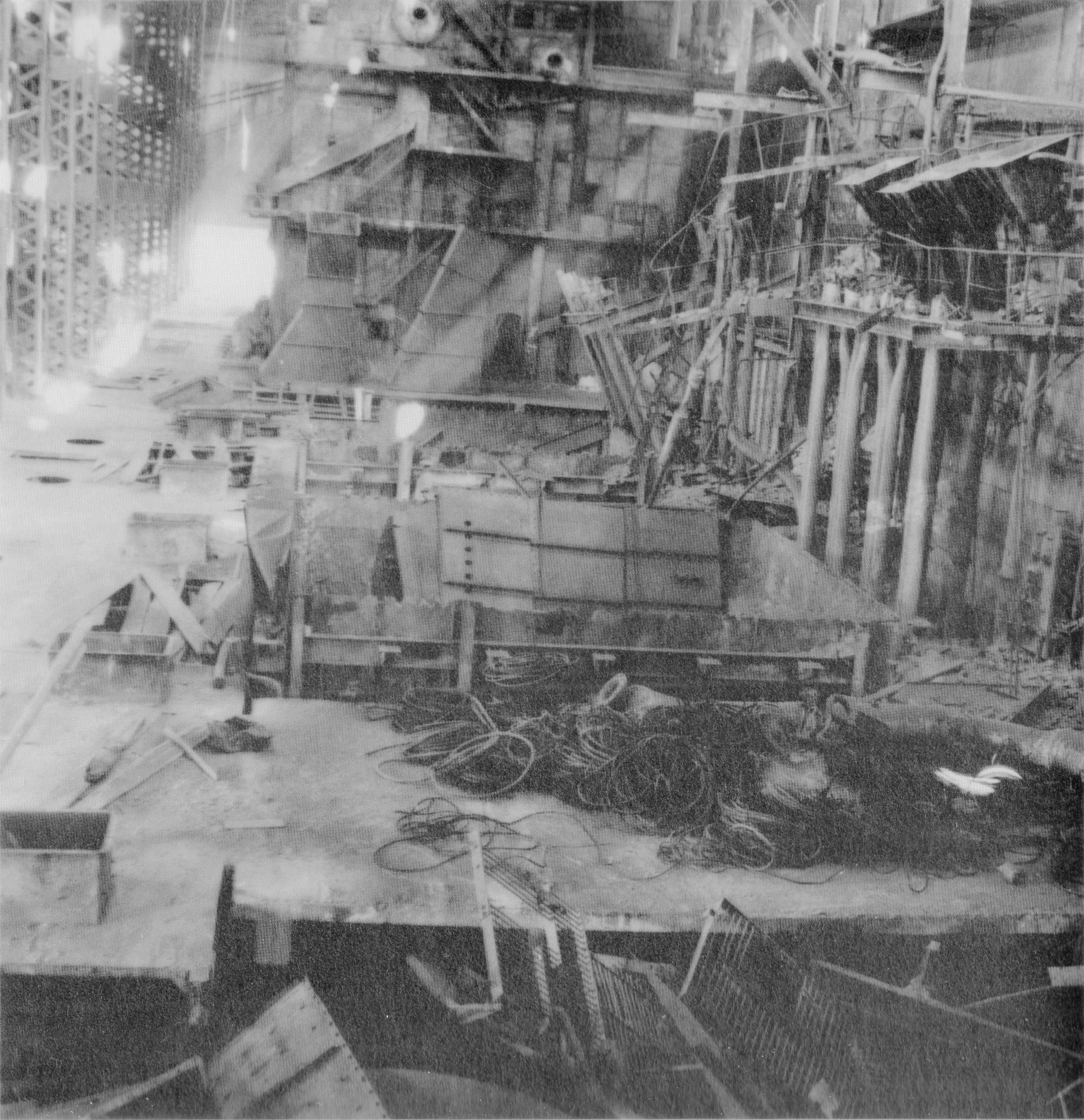
USSR army confiscated two boilers completely and the half of the parts of remaining eight to move to USSR home.

After the end of the war, Workers' and Peasants' Red Army forces dismantled anything that was left of Shōwa Steel Works and shipped it to the Soviet Union. The Chinese communists then occupied the ruins, and rebuilt the factory into the Anshan Iron & Steel Works, which remains one of the major steel producing plants in modern China.

As a side note, on one of the B-29 Superfortress missions, an aircraft commanded by Captain Howard Jarrel suffered engine damage through a Japanese antiaircraft burst over the Anshan target zone. Rather than crash-land in Japanese-held territory, he decided to land in Vladivostok, two hours to the northeast, in the Soviet Far East. As the Soviet Union was still neutral in the Pacific War, when the bomber landed, all crewmen were immediately interned and the aircraft confiscated. This incident led to the development of the Soviet Tu-4 "Bull" bomber, a reverse-engineered copy of the B-29.
