= Nisan Katz =

Israeli filmmaker

- ניסן כץ
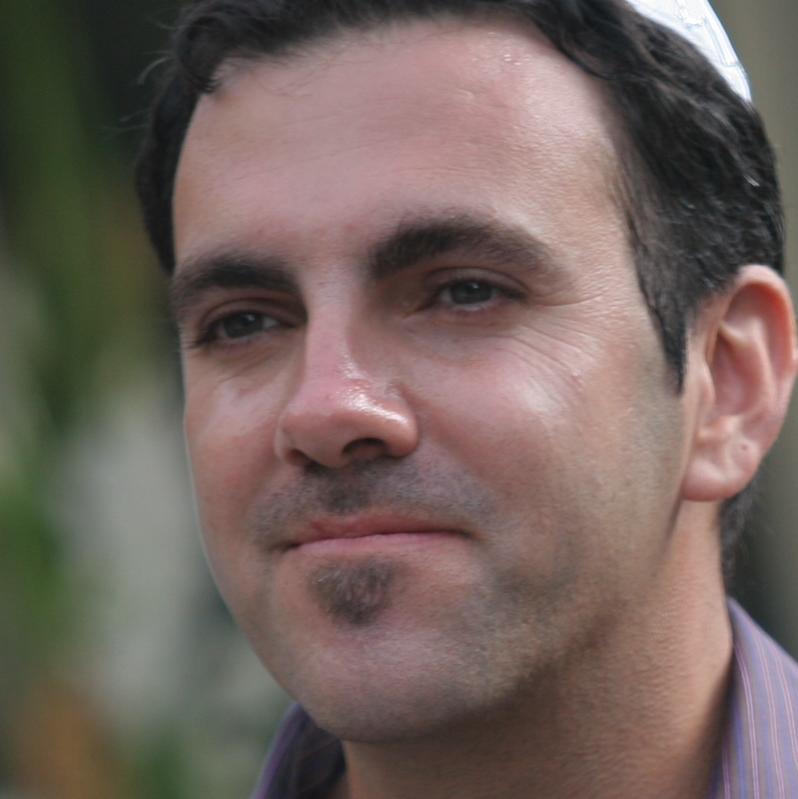
- Born: 2 June 1974 (age 52); Haifa, Israel
- Occupations: Film director, screenwriter, producer, start up Entrepreneur
- Years active: 2001 – present
- Spouse: Lilach Schwartz
- Website: www.nisansun.com

Nisan Katz (Hebrew: ניסן כץ; born in 1974) is an Israeli producer and director. He has been directing and producing documentaries since 2001.

== Career ==
Katz was born in Haifa, Israel. He graduated with honours from Tel Hai film school. Among the films he produced/directed and screened locally and internationally on TV and at festivals worldwide in the last ten years. Nisan also is an entrepreneur and the founder of the start up-"Make My DAY" Location-based errands management mobile app.

== Filmography ==
- 2001 -Director and producer - Thank God for India - A documentary that deals with the generation gap between the young Israeli travelers in India and the conformities of society in Israel today.
- 2003- Director and producer - "Choco banana in North Carolina" about the phenomenon of the young generation in Israel who leave the country to the US after the army.
- 2009-Director and producer of The international production "The Locker Room", about what is really happening in the locker room of the best soccer teams in the world including interviews with the top players and soccer coaches in the world like, Andriy Shevchenko, Felipe Scolari, and Sven-Göran Eriksson. The film was Photographed in Zanzibar, Nepal, and Israel.
- 2010- Director and producer -"The life according to Omer" about a soldier who was killed in Gaza.
- 2012 producer-The USA-France-Israel co-production "Within the eye of the storm" about the story of a Palestinian and Israeli who turned from enemies to brothers, the film picked up 3 awards. “Best Contemporary Issue film” in DocMiami, an award at the “Religion Today” Film Festival and the “Special Award” at the prestigious “Japan Prize” for the educational merits of the film.
- 2014- Director and producer -The documentary "To drink something cold in the middle of the desert" about the life of the Bedouin tribes in Israel.
- 2015- Director and producer - The documentary "Here I am"-The fascinating story of Yekutiel Adam
- 2015- Director and producer- The documentary – " I am a mountain Jew" - a film about young Caucasian Jews who went to a roots journey to find their identity.
