= Yoshisuke Aikawa =

Japanese politician

- 鮎川 義介
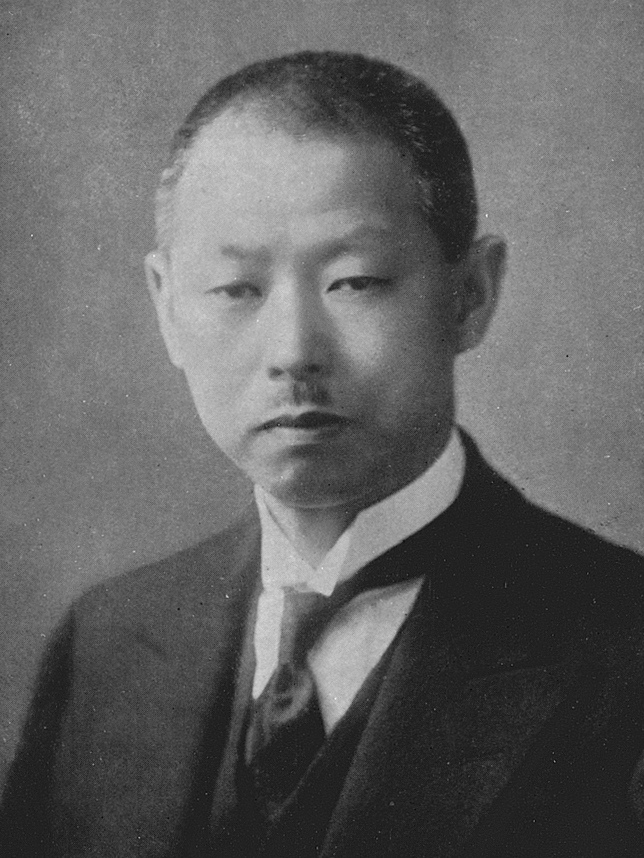
- Aikawa in 1937

Member of the House of Councillors
- In office 3 May 1953 – 29 December 1959
- Constituency: National district

Member of the House of Peers
- In office 14 January 1943 – 15 December 1945 Nominated by the Emperor

Personal details
- Born: 6 November 1880 Yoshiki, Yamaguchi, Japan
- Died: 13 February 1967 (aged 86) Surugadai, Tokyo, Japan
- Resting place: Tama Cemetery
- Party: Independent
- Relatives: Inoue Kaoru (great uncle); Fusanosuke Kuhara (brother-in-law)
- Education: Tokyo Imperial University
- Occupation: Entrepreneur, Industrialist
- Known for: Founder of Nissan and Isuzu
- Nickname: Gisuke Ayukawa

Yoshisuke Aikawa (or Gisuke Ayukawa) (鮎川 義介, Aikawa Yoshisuke; 6 November 1880 – 13 February 1967) was a Japanese entrepreneur, businessman, and politician, noteworthy as the founder and first president of the Nissan zaibatsu, one of Japan's most powerful business conglomerates around the time of the Second World War.

== Early life and education ==
Aikawa was born in what is now part of Yamaguchi city, Yamaguchi Prefecture. His mother was the niece of Meiji period genrō Inoue Kaoru. He graduated from the engineering department of Tokyo Imperial University in 1903 and went to work for Shibaura Seisakusho, the forerunner of Toshiba.

Although his pay was very low, Aikawa managed to save enough to make a trip to the United States, where he studied malleable cast iron technology. After his return to Japan, with the backing of Inoue Kaoru and other ex-Chōshū politicians in the Diet of Japan, he established the Tobata Foundry in Kitakyūshū in 1909. The company is now known as Hitachi Kinzoku (Hitachi Metals Company Ltd).

== Career ==
In 1928, Aikawa became president of the Kuhara Mining Company (present day Nippon Mining & Metals Company) taking over from his brother-in-law Fusanosuke Kuhara and created a holding company called Nihon Sangyo, or Nissan for short. Kuhara went on to a career in politics, forging ties with future Prime Minister Tanaka Giichi and other political and military leaders, which Aikawa would later use to his advantage.

In the stock market boom following the 1931 Mukden incident, Aikawa used the opportunity to buy majority shareholdings in 132 subsidiary companies of Nissan to create a new zaibatsu, the Nissan Group (日産コンツェルン, Nissan Kontserun; "Nissan Concern"). The companies included Nissan Motors, Isuzu, NEC Corporation, Nippon Mining Holdings Company, Nissan Chemicals, Hitachi, Nichiyu Corporation, Nichirei Corporation, Nissan Marine Insurance, Nissan Mutual Life Insurance and others. The group included some of the most technologically advanced companies in Japan at the time.

In 1937, at the invitation of his relative Nobusuke Kishi, he moved to Manchukuo and agreed with the Japanese Kwantung Army's vision of a syndicalist economy and centralized industrial development plan for Manchukuo. He also moved the headquarters of Nissan to Manchukuo, where it became the core of the Manchurian Industrial Development Company, a new Manchukuo zaibatsu.

In his position as president and chairman, Aikawa guided all industrial efforts in Manchukuo, implementing two five-year plans during the 1930s that followed the economic and industrial vision of army ideologist, Naoki Hoshino. However, Aikawa differed from Hoshino's original conception in that he favored a more monopolistic approach. He argued that the economic state of Manchukuo was still too primitive to permit free market capitalism. Aikawa also received bank loans from American steel industrialists to support the Manchukuo economy, which created considerable controversy in the United States with its policy of Non-recognition.

However, while his economic views were in line with Imperial Japanese Army policy, his political views were not. Aikawa was a strong opponent of the Tripartite Pact, and predicted that the forces of the United Kingdom and France would eventually prevail over Nazi Germany should a general war break out. He supported the Fugu Plan, a project to settle Jewish refugees in Manchukuo. In 1942, at the instigation of the Kwantung Army, Aikawa resigned as chairman of the Manchurian Industrial Development Company and moved back to Japan.

After the surrender of Japan, Aikawa was arrested by the American occupation authorities and incarcerated in Sugamo Prison for 20 months as a Class A war crimes suspect. Although he was freed before his case came to trial, during this time the Nissan zaibatsu was dissolved.

After his release, Aikawa played a key role in post-war economic reconstruction of Japan, and purchased a commercial bank to organize loans to small companies. He served as president of Teikoku Oil Company and of the Japan Petroleum Exploration Company, and in 1953, was elected to a seat in the House of Councilors of the Diet of Japan. With the help of Nobusuke Kishi, then prime minister, he achieved his goal in implementing economic-control law and policies as leader of the Chuseiren, a pressure group that became the main federation of small and medium-sized companies in the 1960s.

Aikawa died of acute gall bladder inflammation in 1967. His grave is at the Tama Cemetery outside Tokyo.
