= Propel (company) =

American software company

Propel, Inc.
- Company type: Private
- Industry: Software development
- Founded: 2014; 11 years ago
- Headquarters: Brooklyn, New York City
- Area served: United States
- Key people: Jimmy Chen (cofounder and CEO); Jeff Kaiser (COO)
- Website: joinpropel.com

Propel, Inc. is an American fintech software company that builds services for low income families. It is best known for Providers, a mobile app that allows users to track their Supplemental Nutrition Assistance Program (SNAP) balances and other government benefits. Approximately one quarter of American households receiving SNAP benefits are enrolled in the app.

== History ==
Propel was founded in 2014 in Brooklyn, New York City by Jimmy Chen, a former Facebook engineer, through a fellowship at Robin Hood Foundation's tech incubator Blue Ridge Labs. The company initially developed a website to help New York City residents apply for SNAP benefits. The company raised $11,000 in crowdfunding from Kickstarter, but failed to get any additional funding after pitching the idea to around 60 investors.

The company pivoted to FreshEBT, an app that allows SNAP users to check their SNAP balances without calling their state's benefits provider. The app was released on the Google and Apple app stores in 2016. The app was later renamed to Providers.

In 2017, Propel raised $4 million in a seed funding round from Andreessen Horowitz, Kevin Durant, Nas, Omidyar Network, and other investors. It raised a further $12.8 million in a Series A in 2018, after which the company opened an office in Downtown Brooklyn.

During the COVID-19 pandemic, Propel assisted users in applying for increased food stamp payments or other pandemic-specific programs. The company also partnered with charities such as GiveDirectly to distribute over $10 million cash payments to its users.

The company also runs a debit card banking product designed for government benefits recipients. The company raised an additional $50 million in a Series B funding round in 2022, most of it intended for expansion of the debit product.

== Products ==
Propel focuses on software for low-income households, especially SNAP recipients.

- Providers: allows users to check their SNAP balances from the app. The company earns revenue through advertisements to nonprofits, grocery stores, and other businesses relevant to SNAP recipients.
- Providers Card: a mobile banking product designed for government benefit recipients. The app tracks when users will next receive their monthly payments and provides news and updates about their benefits.

== Data access issues ==
In 2018, Conduent accused Propel of overloading its network with data requests. The company, which operates the Electronic Benefits Transfer (EBT) network for 25 states, took action to block Propel's "unauthorized access" to its network. Propel estimated this affected approximately 80% of its users. In California, the app was offline for more than a month.
