= Nissan Chemical Corporation =

Japanese chemical company

- Native name: 日産化学株式会社
- Type: Public (K.K)
- Traded as: TYO: 4021; Nikkei 225 Component
- ISIN: JP3670800006
- Industry: Chemicals
- Founded: February 1887; 139 years ago
- Founder: Jokichi Takamine; Eiichi Shibusawa; Takashi Masuda
- Headquarters: Nihonbashi, Chuo-ku, Tokyo 103-6119, Japan
- Area served: Worldwide
- Key people: Kojiro Kinoshita (President and CEO)
- Products: Basic chemicals; Semiconductor materials; Inorganic materials; Herbicides; Insecticides; Fungicides; Livalo; Landel
- Revenue: ▲JPY 193.4 billion (FY 2017) (US$ 1.8 billion)
- Net income: ▲JPY 27.1 billion (FY 2017) (US$ 255 million)
- Number of employees: 2,583 (consolidated, as of March 31, 2019)
- Website: Official website

Nissan Chemical Corporation (日産化学株式会社, Nissan Kagaku Kabushiki-gaisha) is a Japanese company and constituent of the Nikkei 225 stock index.

== History ==
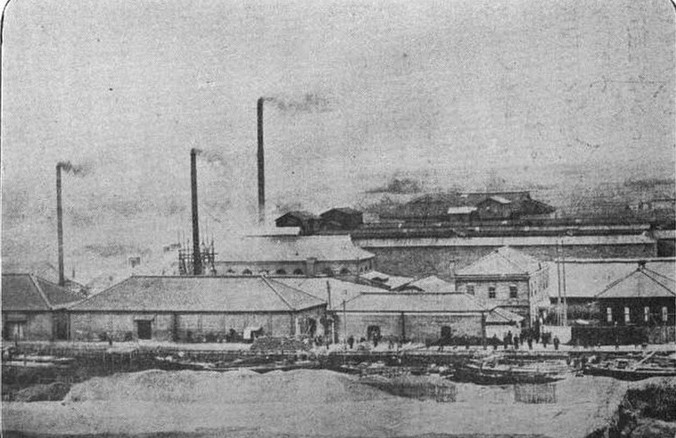
The Tokyo Jinzo Hiryo factory in 1908

The company was founded in 1887 as "Tokyo Jinzo Hiryo" (Tokyo Artificial Fertilizer Company) by Jokichi Takamine, Eiichi Shibusawa and Takashi Masuda. Takamine served as chief technical advisor for the company. The company opened its first manufacturing plant in Kōtō, and in 1888, started producing superphosphate.

The company was renamed to "Dainippon Jinzo Hiryo" (Dai Nippon Artificial Fertilizer Company) in 1910. In 1923, the companies of Kanto Soda and Nippon Kagaku Hiryo were merged under the Dainippon Jinzo Hiryo name. The resulting company was brought into the Nissan Group in 1937, and was renamed as Nissan Chemical Industries.

In 1928, the company began production of ammonia and ammonium sulfate at a plant in Toyama.

After World War II, the Nissan group was dissolved, along with several other zaibatsus, as part of the Allied occupation strategy for Japan. Nissan Chemical Industries continued on under the same name.

The company changed the corporate name to Nissan Chemical Corporation on July 1, 2018.

On September 1, 2026, Nissan Chemical established a wholly owned subsidiary in Zhangjiagang, China, with registered capital of 210 million yuan. The subsidiary was established to manufacture and sell semiconductor materials, including anti-reflective coatings for photoresists and multilayer materials.

== Business segments ==
The four main businesses of Nissan Chemical are Chemicals, Performance Materials, Agricultural Materials and Pharmaceuticals. Among the company's products are LCD materials such as SUNEVER® and an external antiparasite drug for animals called Fluralaner, which is an active ingredient in the veterinary pharmaceutical "BRAVECTO®", developed by MSD Animal Health (MSD), the global animal health business of Merck & Co., Ltd.
