= Tohatsu =

Outboard motor manufacturer

Tohatsu Corporation
- Native name: トーハツ株式会社
- Company type: Private KK
- Industry: Transportation equipment
- Predecessor: Yokosuka Naval Arsenal
- Founded: Tokyo, Japan (April 1922; 104 years ago)
- Headquarters: Azusawa, Itabashi-ku, Tokyo, 174-0051, Japan
- Key people: Isami Hyuga (President)
- Products: Outboard motors; Pleasure boats; Portable fire pumps
- Revenue: JPY 182 billion (FY 2014) (US$ 1.51 billion) (FY 2014)
- Number of employees: 500 (consolidated, as of 2015)
- Website: Official website

Tohatsu Corporation (トーハツ株式会社, Tōhatsu Kabushiki-gaisha), previously Tokyo Hatsudoki Company, is a Japanese company manufacturing and selling outboard motors, pleasure boats, portable fire pumps, small fire trucks, pumps for construction and drainage, and refrigeration units for transportation. It also does real estate property management in Japan.

== History ==
The company can be traced back to 1922, when the Takata Motor Research Institute began carrying out research into various forms of internal combustion engines. Research and development of high-speed, portable engine generators and radio-controlled generators began immediately; these were brought to production in 1930. During the 1930s and 40s, Tohatsu consolidated its product line and moved its corporate office to Tokyo. Among its products in the 1930s were railcars for the Ministry of Railways.

In 1950, production and sales of motorcycles began. 1955 brought aggressive growth to Tohatsu. Capital increased to 150 million yen and production on a new line of engines started. Sales offices were established in Fukuoka, Nagoya, Tokyo, Sendai and Sapporo. Dealerships were set up throughout Japan.

In the mid-1950s, the company held the top market share, with 22 percent of the Japanese motorbike market. They also manufactured racing motorcycles and achieved success in Japan and abroad. Financial problems led to the discontinuation of Tohatsu motorcycle production in 1964.

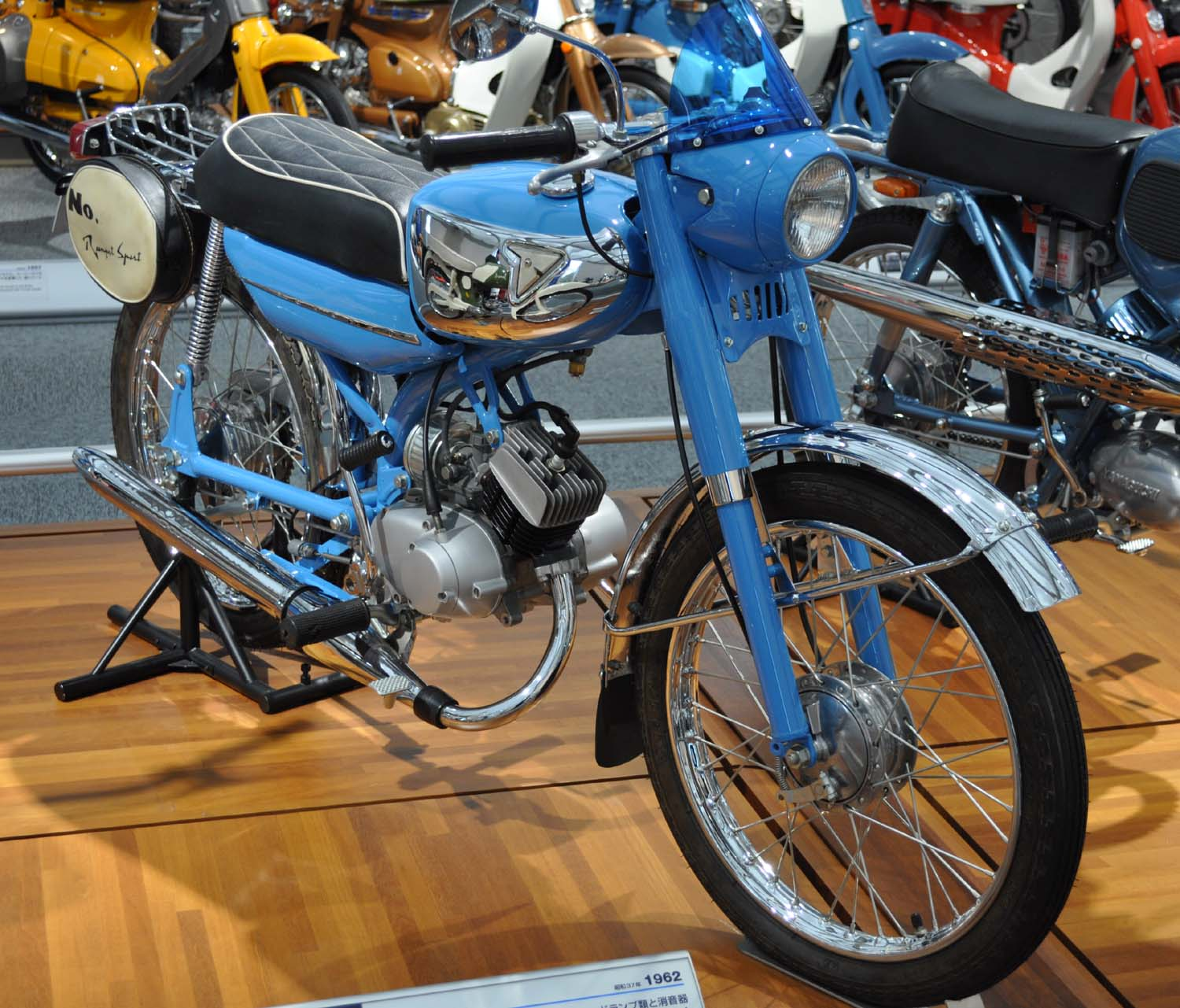
A Tohatsu Runpet Sports CA2 motorcycle from 1962

== Tohatsu outboards ==
1956 ushered in the production of the first Tohatsu outboards (1.5 hp). Since then, Tohatsu outboards have served a variety of marketplaces: commercial fishing, military, marine transport, surf life saving, recreation and competition racing. They are the second largest producer of outboards in the world.

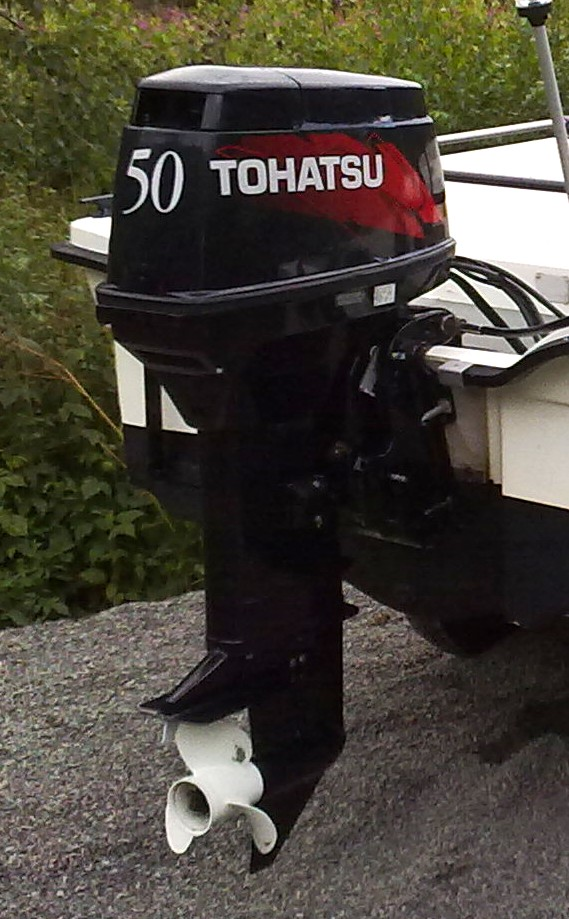
A 2007 model Tohatsu outboard

As well as marketing outboards under its own brand, Tohatsu outboards are rebadged and sold as other brands. In 1988 Tohatsu and Brunswick Corporation set up a joint venture named Tohatsu Marine Corporation to produce outboards for Mercury Marine. Some Mercury outboards with less than 60 HP are rebranded Tohatsus.

In 2011, Tohatsu and Evinrude Outboard Motors made a deal to make smaller engines ranging from 15 HP and down with Evinrude decals.

All outboard engines sold in North America by the now-defunct Nissan Marine were rebadged Tohatsus.

Tohatsu four stroke outboard engines above 50 HP sold in North America after 2013 are rebadged Honda, though at some point after that Tohatsu introduced their own 60 HP model which is an up-rated variant of their 40/50 HP engine. As of at least 2022 all outboards up to 60 HP are designed and built by Tohatsu.
