= Manchurian Industrial Development Company =

1937–1945 Japanese company in Manchukuo

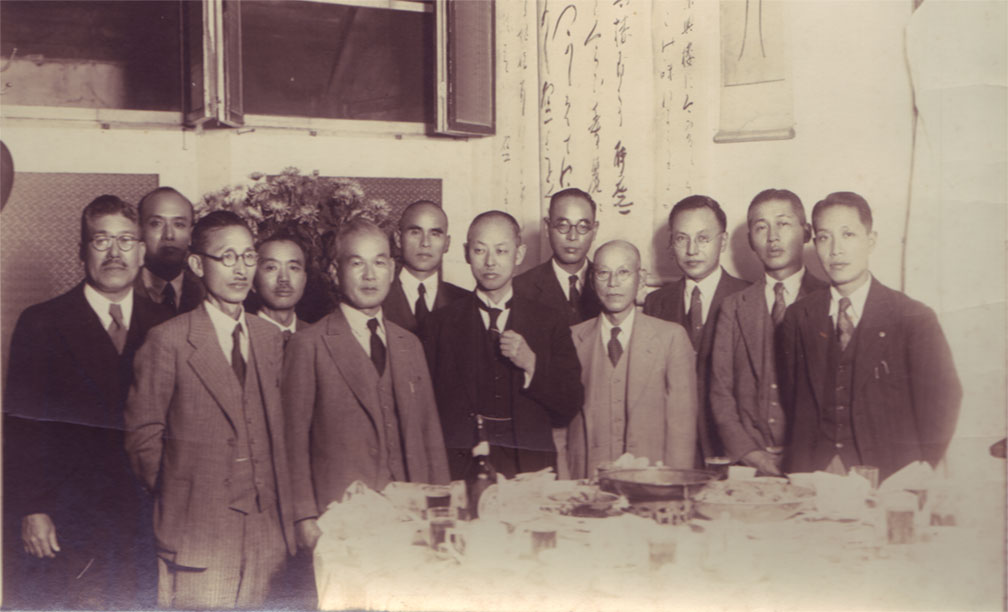
Meeting of the Board of Mangyō, October 10, 1939. Aikawa is in the center

The Manchurian Industrial Development Company (満州重工業開発株式会社, Manshū Jukōgyō Kaihatsu Kabushiki-gaisha, or Mangyō) (Hanyu Pinyin: Mǎnzhōu Zhònggōngyè Kāifā Zhūshì Huìshè; Wade–Giles: Man-chou Chung-kung-yeh K'ai-fa Chu-shih Hui-she) was an industrial conglomerate, or zaibatsu, in the Japanese-controlled Manchukuo, established at the instigation of the Imperial Japanese Army to further the industrialization of Manchukuo, and in particular, to make it self-sufficient in strategic heavy industries.

== History ==
Following on the economic success of the South Manchurian Railway Company, and its various subsidiaries, such as the Showa Steel Works, ideological and economic planners from the Kwantung Army developed a comprehensive plan for the future economic and industrial development of Manchukuo per a state socialist model with a command economy. Prominent Japanese entrepreneur and technocrat, Yoshisuke Aikawa, the founder of the Nissan zaibatsu was invited to Manchukuo and asked to establish the Manchukuo Industrial Development Company, a joint venture owned 50% by Nissan and 50% by the Manchukuo government, which would oversee the central plan.

The original plan under Naoki Hoshino and other Army planners envisioned a syndicalist economy, with the military allocating monopolies of one firm per industry. From 1932, the Japanese military had created 26 new companies, ranging from automobiles, aircraft, oil refining, shipping, etc.

Aikawa countered that this policy was unrealistic given the undeveloped state of Manchukuo's resources and industrial infrastructure, and persuaded the military leaders that there should be a single state-controlled entity to manage all of resource development and heavy industry. Aikawa argued that the automotive industry and aircraft industry both required a large number of subcontractors, few of whom were present in Manchukuo. To develop these strategic industries, would be necessary to develop all related machinery industries simultaneously.

In October 1937, Aikawa was given his way, and the Manshū Jukōgyō Kaihatsu Yoko (Manchurian Heavy Industrial Development Corporation) was established under the aegis of Nissan, which also moved its headquarters to Xinjing, Manchukuo. Aikawa was guaranteed loans from the Industrial Bank of Japan, Bank of Japan using the natural resources of Manchukuo as collateral, and was granted exemption from dual taxation. The South Manchurian Railway Company, Showa Steel Company and other major industrial concerns in Manchukuo were tied into the new company through cross-holding of shares.

In its initial phases, the new conglomerate was a tremendous success, pulling investment into Manchukuo at a tremendous rate. New industries were created along the transportation routes established by the South Manchurian Railway, and the industrial output of Manchukuo began to outstrip Japan in certain sectors by the end of the first Five Year Plan. However, Aikawa faced numerous difficulties partly due to issues with his politics (which were often at odds with the Kwantung Army leadership), and partly due to interference in the operations of Mangyō by members of the Manchukuo civil government. Aikawa resigned in 1942, and moved back to Japan. He was replaced by Tatsunosuke Takasaki; however, with the growing demands of the military due to World War II and the ongoing quagmire for the Japanese military in China, Mangyō faced severe problems in raw materials, labor, and the subordination of its production into military requirements.

Mangyō was dissolved with the destruction of Manchukuo by the Soviet Red Army in the invasion of Manchuria at the end of World War II.
