= Nissan Marine =

Nissan Marine began their North American operations in 1984 in Memphis, Tennessee as a division of Nissan Industrial Equipment Co. Over the next 6 years, the Marine Division experienced explosive growth and in 1991 Nissan Marine was separated from Nissan Industrial Equipment into a standalone company. Nissan Marine then moved their headquarters to Dallas, Texas. In the U.S., Nissan Marine is one name under which Tohatsu outboards are sold. In late 2014 Nissan Marine discontinued production of outboards worldwide.
