= Nissan Life =

Japanese insurance company

Nissan Mutual Life Insurance Company (日産生命保険相互会社) was a Japanese company established in 1909 that went bankrupt on April 25, 1997. It was the first time since the postwar period that a life insurer went bankrupt.

Aoba Life Insurance took over all its insurance contracts in October 1997. Aoba was a company established in June by the Life Insurance Association of Japan, the trustee appointed by the Ministry of Finance to handle the assets and liabilities of Nissan Mutual Life Insurance. On November 30, 1999 Aoba was sold to Artémis, a French holding controlled by François Pinault. Prudential Financial purchased Aoba in 2004.

== See also ==
- Economy of Japan
- list of Japanese companies
