= 1954 in Japan =

- Decades: 1930s; 1940s; 1950s; 1960s; 1970s
- See also: Other events of 1954; History of Japan; Timeline; Years

Events in the year 1954 in Japan. It corresponds to Shōwa 29 (昭和29年) in the Japanese calendar.

Demographically, Young Japanese Baby Boom Generation (also known as Danso Generation or Hitohata Generation) is the first youngest Japanese demographic cohort, which approximately born between 1954 and 1960. It was situated between Showa Baby Boomers (Dankai no Sedai) and Shinjinrui Generation. It was characterized by the formative of economic boom, high spending on items (such as automobiles, electronics, AV equipment, and overseas travel), belief in lifetime employment, career conservatism, strong work ethic, and traditional seniority system. They are considered as original "Otaku" generation, a term referring to youngest Japanese people with consuming interests, particularly in anime and manga subcultures that were growing at the time. They grew up during Japanese economic miracle, and they spent their entire formative years within the period of Japan's rapid economic development. Unlike Showa baby boomers, who experienced their immediate post-war hardships, they experienced their significant economic growth and social change in Japan during their formative years. They spent entirely within the period of Japan's rapid economic development and bubble economy during post-war period. This first youngest Japanese generation was played a role in shaping modern Japanese consumer culture and shifting social norms regarding women's roles and expression in a rapidly changing economy.

== Incumbents ==
- Emperor: Hirohito
- Prime minister: Shigeru Yoshida (Liberal Democratic) until December 10, Ichirō Hatoyama (Liberal Democratic)
- Chief Cabinet Secretary: Kenji Fukunaga until December 10, Ryutaro Nemoto
- Chief Justice of the Supreme Court: Kōtarō Tanaka
- President of the House of Representatives: Yasujirō Tsutsumi until December 10, Tō Matsunaga from December 11
- President of the House of Councillors: Yahachi Kawai

=== Governors ===
- Aichi Prefecture: Mikine Kuwahara
- Akita Prefecture: Tokuji Ikeda
- Aomori Prefecture: Bunji Tsushima
- Chiba Prefecture: Hitoshi Shibata
- Ehime Prefecture: Sadatake Hisamatsu
- Fukui Prefecture: Harukazu Obata
- Fukuoka Prefecture: Katsuji Sugimoto
- Fukushima Prefecture: Sakuma Ootake
- Gifu Prefecture: Kamon Muto
- Gunma Prefecture: Shigeo Kitano
- Hiroshima Prefecture: Hiroo Ōhara
- Hokkaido: Toshifumi Tanaka
- Hyogo Prefecture: Masaru Sakamoto
- Ibaraki Prefecture: Yoji Tomosue
- Ishikawa Prefecture: Wakio Shibano
- Iwate Prefecture: Kenkichi Kokubun
- Kagawa Prefecture: Masanori Kaneko
- Kagoshima Prefecture: Katsushi Terazono
- Kanagawa Prefecture: Iwataro Uchiyama
- Kochi Prefecture: Wakaji Kawamura
- Kumamoto Prefecture: Saburō Sakurai
- Kyoto Prefecture: Torazō Ninagawa
- Mie Prefecture: Masaru Aoki
- Miyagi Prefecture: Otogorō Miyagi
- Miyazaki Prefecture: Nagashige Tanaka
- Nagano Prefecture: Torao Hayashi
- Nagasaki Prefecture: Takejirō Nishioka
- Nara Prefecture: Ryozo Okuda
- Niigata Prefecture: Shohei Okada
- Oita Prefecture: Tokuju Hosoda
- Okayama Prefecture: Yukiharu Miki
- Osaka Prefecture: Bunzō Akama
- Saga Prefecture: Naotsugu Nabeshima
- Saitama Prefecture: Yuuichi Oosawa
- Shiga Prefecture: Kotaro Mori
- Shiname Prefecture: Yasuo Tsunematsu
- Shizuoka Prefecture: Toshio Saitō
- Tochigi Prefecture: Aiji Nishio (until 7 November); Juukichi Kodaira (starting 7 November)
- Tokushima Prefecture: Kuniichi Abe
- Tokyo: Seiichirō Yasui
- Tottori Prefecture: Shigeru Endo
- Toyama Prefecture: Kunitake Takatsuji
- Wakayama Prefecture: Shinji Ono
- Yamagata Prefecture: Michio Murayama
- Yamaguchi Prefecture: Taro Ozawa
- Yamanashi Prefecture: Hisashi Amano

== Events ==
- January 2 – A stampede occurs in Nijubashi, Imperial Square, Tokyo, with 16 fatalities, according to Japan National Police Agency confirmed report.ja:二重橋事件
- January 18 – Mabuchi Motor was founded in Matsudo, Chiba Prefecture.
- February 1 – A first issue of Chūnichi Sports was published in Nagoya.
- April 26 – Akira Kurosawa's Seven Samurai released in Japan.
- July 1 – The Japanese Self-Defense Forces are established.
- September 26
  - A typhoon in the Tsugaru Strait sinks the ferry Tōya Maru, killing over 1,100 passengers and crew, wrecks at least seven other ships and seriously damages nine more.
  - A massive fire in Iwanai, Hokkaido, a result of Typhoon Marie, leaves 38 people dead, 551 people injured according to Japan Fire and Disaster Management Agency official confirmed report.ja:岩内大火
- October 8 – A sightseeing boat Uchigo Maru capsized due to overcrowding in Lake Sagami, Kanagawa Prefecture, 22 junior high school students perished, according to Japanese government confirmed report.
- November 3 – Godzilla released in Japan.
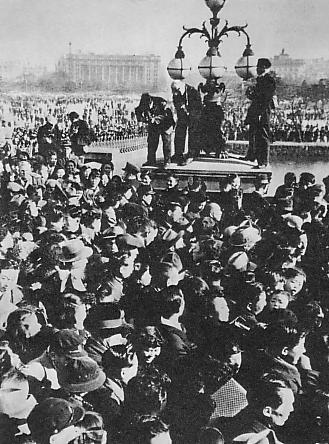
A scene of stampede in Nijyubashi, Tokyo, 2 January.

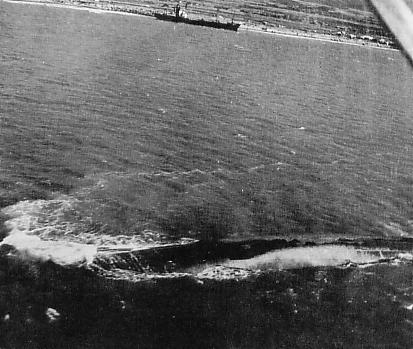
1954 Toya Maru accident on 27 September.

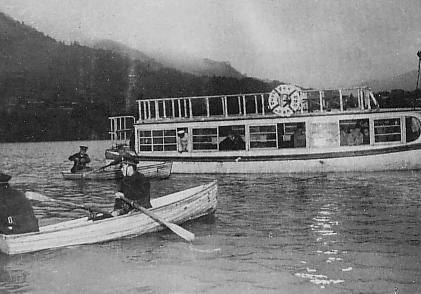
A sightseeing boat Uchigo-Maru capsized in Lake Sagami, Kanagawa Prefecture on 8 October.

== Births ==
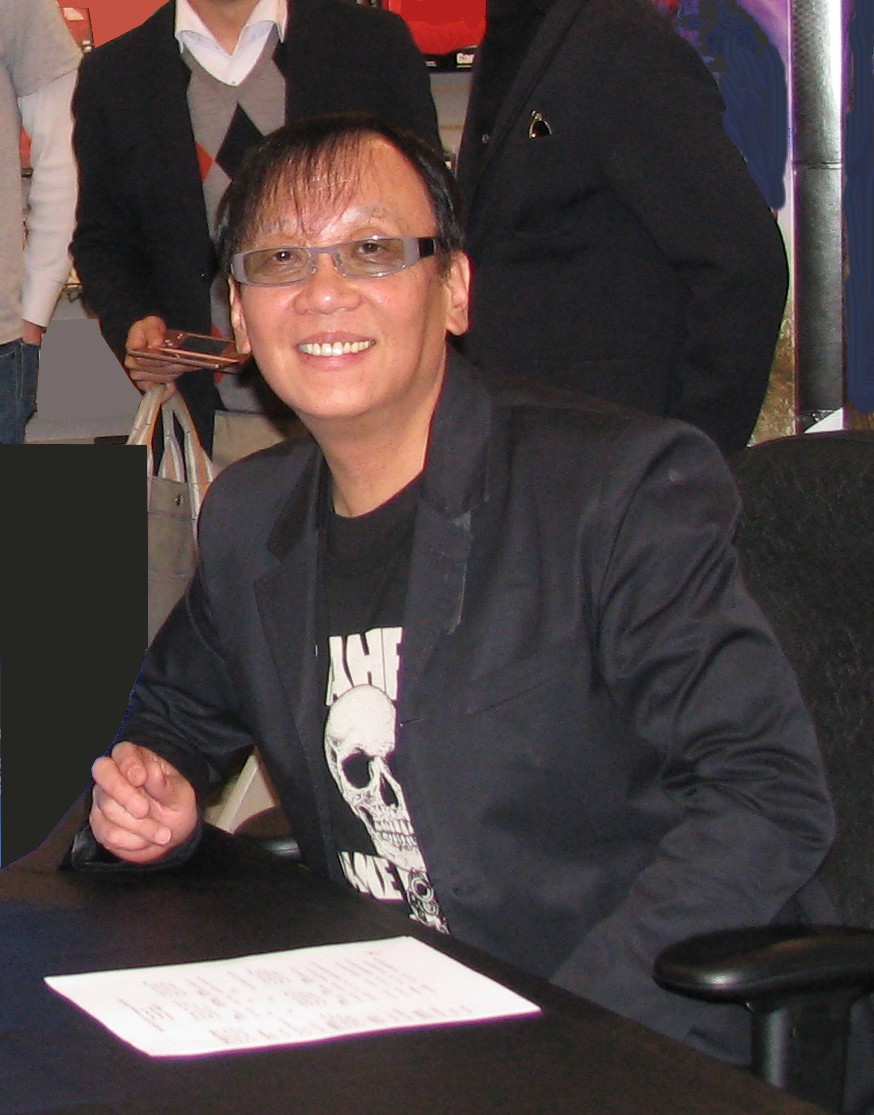
Yuji Horii, Japanese video game designer

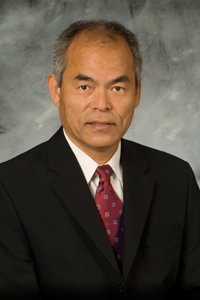
Shuji Nakamura, Japanese electronics engineer

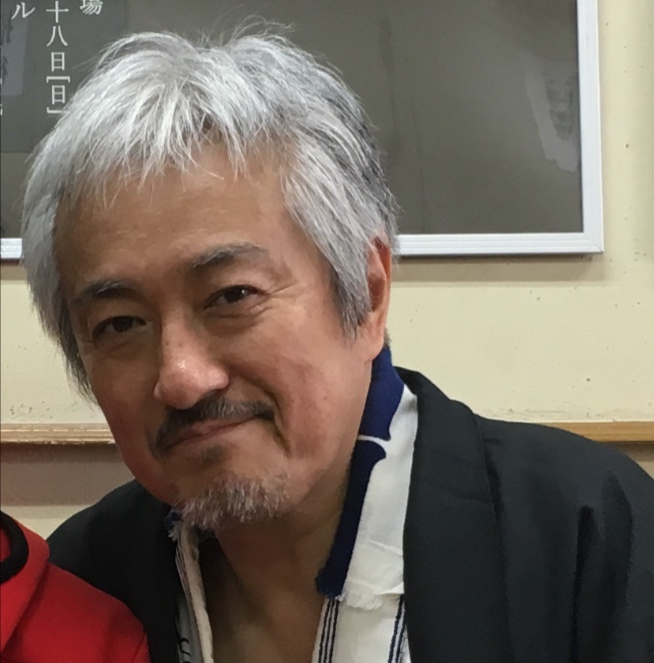
Kazuhiro Yamaji, Japanese actor and voice actor

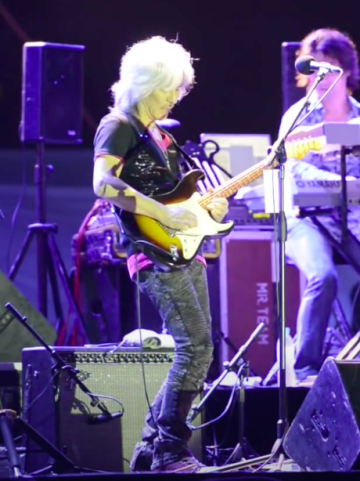
Masahiro Ando, Japanese musician and guitarist of T-Square (band)

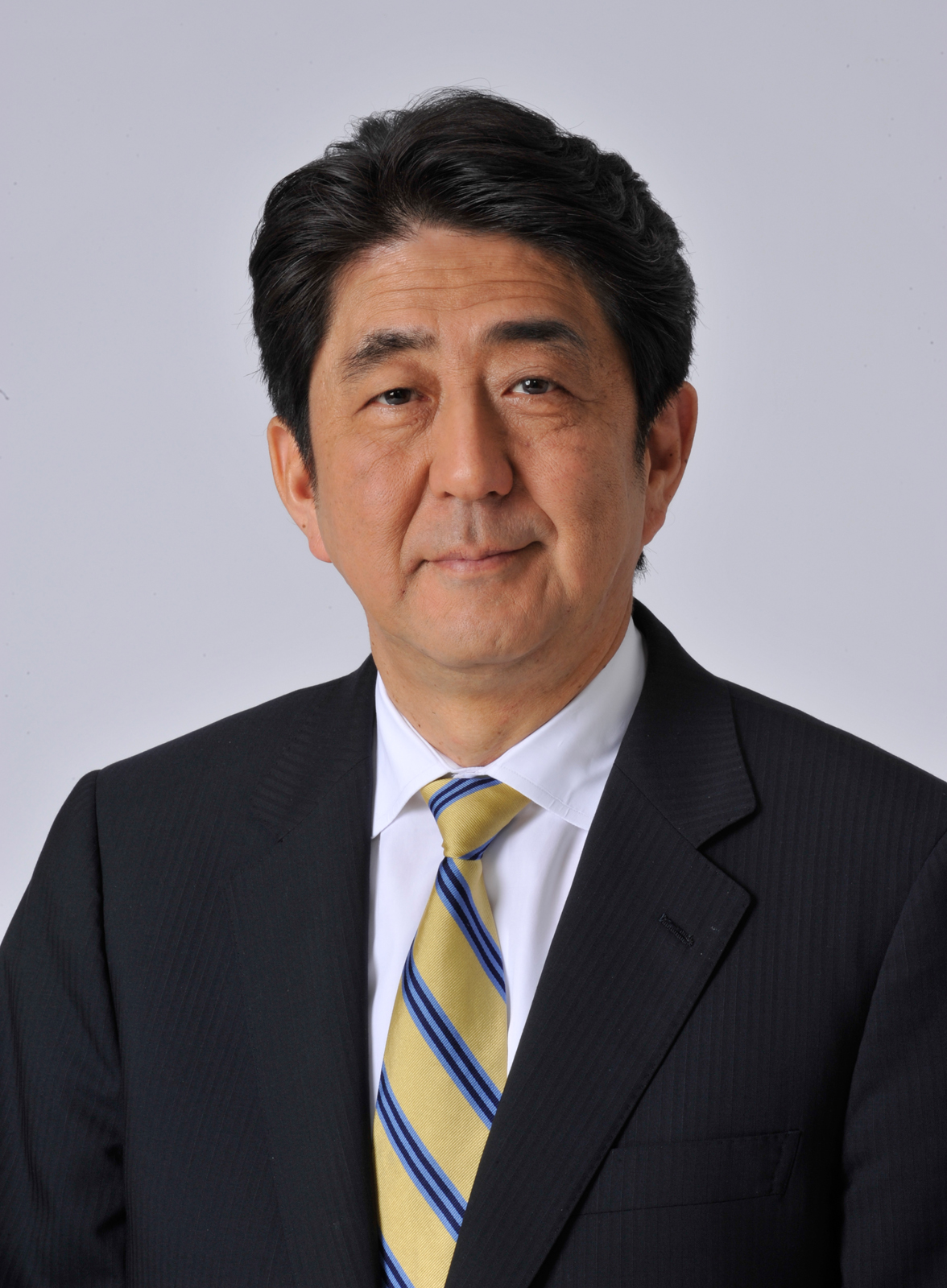
Shinzo Abe, former Prime Minister of Japan (2006-2007; 2012-2020)

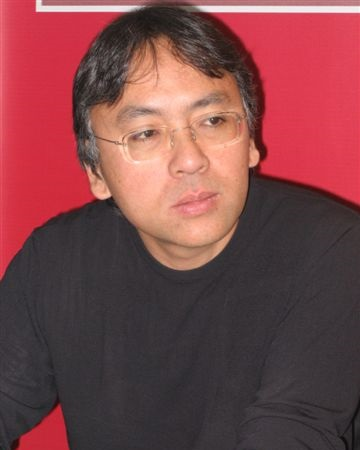
Kazuo Ishiguro, Nobel Prize-winning Japanese-British writer

Many notable Japanese individuals from Young Japanese Baby Boom/Danso Generation were born in 1954, such as Harumi Takahashi, Yuji Horii, Yasushi Tao, Masanobu Fuchi, Yumi Matsutoya, Fumiyo Kohinata, Joko Ninomiya, Hiroko Ota, Keiko Mizukoshi, Shigeru Chiba, Noriyuki Asakura, Yuji Takada, Takeshi Ito, Kazuhiko Inoue, Mariko Hayashi, Susumu Hirasawa, Ichiro Tsuruta, Akira creator Katsuhiro Otomo, The Climber creator Shinichi Sakamoto, Kazuko Kurosawa, Masaaki Suzuki, Tomiko Yoshikawa, Shuji Nakamura, Hakubun Shimomura, Ai Kanzaki, Kazuhiro Yamaji, Yuji Iwasawa, Tomoyo Nonaka, Kumiko Akiyoshi, Akihiko Tanaka, Masahiro Ando, former Japanese Prime Minister Shinzo Abe, Izumi Yamaguchi, Yoshie Taira, Tomoko Ai, Nobel Prize-winning Japanese-British writer Kazuo Ishiguro, Tsumori Chisato, Mari Matsunaga, Sumi Shimamoto, and Hideshi Matsuda.

=== January–March ===
- January 6
  - Harumi Takahashi, politician and Governor of Hokkaido
  - Yuji Horii, video game designer
- January 8 – Yasushi Tao, professional baseball player and coach
- January 9
  - Tateo Ozaki, professional golfer
  - Satoshi Kirishima, anarchist and terrorist (d. 2024)
- January 14
  - Hideo Hiraoka, politician and lawyer
  - Junichi Ishida, actor and TV presenter
  - Masanobu Fuchi, professional wrestler
- January 15 – Tetsumi Takara, politician
- January 18 – Katsutoshi Kawamura, ice hockey player
- January 19 – Yumi Matsutoya, singer
- January 23 – Fumiyo Kohinata, actor
- January 27 – Joko Ninomiya, karate practitioner
- January 28 – Kaneto Shiozawa, voice actor (d. 2000)
- January 29 – Yukinobu Hoshino, cartoonist
- February 2 – Hiroko Ota, politician, university president, and researcher of economics
- February 4
  - Keiko Mizukoshi, musician, lyricist, and composer
  - Shigeru Chiba, actor and voice actor
- February 11 – Noriyuki Asakura, composer
- February 15 – Motohiko Kondo, politician
- February 17 – Yuji Takada, free-style wrestler
- February 25 – Mitsuko Ishii, politician
- March 1 – Katsuko Kanesaka, volleyball player and Olympic champion
- March 2 – Gara Takashima, voice actress
- March 12 – Hajime Meshiai, professional golfer
- March 15 – Takeshi Ito, jazz musician and a member of jazz fusion band T-Square
- March 23 – Hideyuki Hori, voice actor
- March 26 – Kazuhiko Inoue, voice actor

=== April–June ===
- April 1 – Mariko Hayashi, writer
- April 2 – Susumu Hirasawa, musician
- April 5 – Kenji Yamada, politician and former Governor of Kyoto Prefecture
- April 14
  - Ichiro Tsuruta, bijinga artist
  - Katsuhiro Otomo, manga artist, screenwriter, and creator of Akira
- April 16 – Shinichi Sakamoto, manga artist and creator of The Climber
- April 17
  - Norio Imamura, voice actor
  - Tetsuro Aikawa, businessman and former president of Mitsubishi Motors Corporation
- April 22 – Jōji Nakata, voice actor
- April 29
  - Kazuko Kurosawa, costume designer
  - Masaaki Suzuki, organist and harpsichordist
- May 1 – Akihiro Maeta, ceramist
- May 10 – Tomiko Yoshikawa, woman racing driver
- May 19 – Hōchū Ōtsuka, voice actor
- May 22 – Shuji Nakamura, electronics engineer
- May 23 – Hakubun Shimomura, politician and activist
- May 30 – Ai Kanzaki, actress
- June 2 – Chiyoko Kawashima, voice actress
- June 5 – Fumi Dan, actress
- June 4
  - Kazuhiro Yamaji, actor and voice actor
  - Yuji Iwasawa, jurist
- June 10 – Ichiro Aisawa, politician
- June 18 – Tomoyo Nonaka, TV presenter and businesswoman

=== July–September ===
- July 2 – Saori Minami, idol and singer
- July 10 – Yō Yoshimura, voice actor (d. 1991)
- July 29
  - Kumiko Akiyoshi, actress
  - Kazuo Shii, politician
- August 1 – Junpei Morita, actor and voice actor
- August 7
  - Akihiko Tanaka, scholar and President of Japan International Cooperation Agency
  - Kosaburo Nishime, politician
- September 9 – Yukio Segawa, former professional boxer
- September 13 – Shoko Takayanagi, volleyball player
- September 16 – Masahiro Ando, musician, guitarist of T-Square (band)
- September 21 – Shinzo Abe, Prime Minister of Japan (d. 2022)
- September 28 – Tadashi Inuzuka, politician

=== October–December ===
- October 3
  - Izumi Yamaguchi, actress
  - Tsuyoshi Yamaguchi, politician
- October 12 – Yoshie Taira, actress
- October 18 – Yūji Mitsuya, voice actor
- October 20 – Tsuneyuki Nakajima, professional golfer
- October 25 – Katsuyoshi Tomori, professional golfer
- October 29 – Tomoko Ai, actress
- November 8 – Kazuo Ishiguro, Nobel Prize-winning author
- November 12 – Tsumori Chisato, fashion designer
- November 13 – Mari Matsunaga, businesswoman, editor, and writer
- November 20 – Bin Shimada, voice actor
- November 26 – Masahiro Anzai, actor and voice actor (d. 2021)
- December 8 – Sumi Shimamoto, actress, voice actress, and narrator
- December 16 – Isao Yamase, Olympic biathlete
- December 22 – Hideshi Matsuda, car racer and TV reporter
- December 23 – Yoichi Machishima, retired cyclist
- December 25 – Masaichi Kinoshita, biathlete

== Deaths ==
- July 28 – Sōjin Kamiyama, film star during the silent film era (b. 1884)
- September 21 – Mikimoto Kōkichi, pearl farm pioneer (b. 1858)
- October 6 – Yukio Ozaki, politician (b. 1859)

== See also ==
- 1954 in Japanese football
- List of Japanese films of 1954
