= Kagurazaka Women's Choir =

Japanese charity choir

Kagurazaka Women's Choir (神楽坂女声合唱団, Kagurazaka Josei Gasshōdan) is a Japanese women's charity choir founded in May 2000 by cooking researcher Katsuyo Kobayashi. The group holds dinner shows every Christmas "for underprivileged animals" and also participates in regional performances and various charity events. In July 2002, it released its group anthem "Midori no Hoshi ni" (緑の星に, "On the Green Star") as a charity CD through Avex, with a portion of the sales donated to a fund supporting the independence of women in Afghanistan.

The choir consists of prominent women from various fields, including actresses, lawyers, politicians, journalists, and manga artists. Notable soloists have included Takako Doi (politician), Chieko Baisho (actress), and Kumiko (chanson singer). Stage costumes are designed by Junko Koshino, which has also drawn attention.

It frequently collaborates with the Roppongi Male Choir, which is composed of prominent men from various fields and is considered its brother group.

== Notable members ==
~ indicates former, retired, or deceased members.

- Atsuko Ishizuka (Mainichi Shimbun reporter)
- Yoko Ueno (musician/producer)
- Kumiko (chanson singer)
- Katsuyo Kobayashi (died 2014; cooking researcher, former director)
- Sachiko Kobayashi (singer)
- Machiko Satonaka (manga artist)
- Keiko Takeshita~ (actress)
- Kiyomi Tsujimoto~ (Member of the House of Representatives (Constitutional Democratic Party of Japan); was a member of the Social Democratic Party (Japan) at the time of joining)
- Takako Doi~ (Social Democratic Party (Japan) former leader)
- Tomoyo Nonaka~ (journalist/former chairman of Sanyo Electric)
- Chieko Baisho (actress)
- Mizuho Fukushima (lawyer, Social Democratic Party vice leader (former leader))

== Staff ==
- Former conductors: Masayuki Tsuji~, Yoko Matsuo~ (regular conductor of Central Aichi Symphony Orchestra), Nobuki Okumura~
- Conductor/pianist: Shirō Tsuji
- Pianist: Tomiko Kuroo
- Assistant Conductor: Hiroshi Kurihara
- Scriptwriter: Yoko Yamazaki~
- Kagurazaka Women's Choir Secretary-General: Harumichi Hirota
