= Matsunaga =

Matsunaga (written: 松永) is a Japanese surname. Notable people with the surname include:

- Daniel Matsunaga, Japanese-Brazilian model, actor and football player currently based in the Philippines
- Enzo Matsunaga, author
- Futoshi Matsunaga, Japanese serial killer
- Hikaru Matsunaga, Japanese legislator and finance minister
- Hisahide Matsunaga, daimyō of the Matsunaga clan in the Sengoku period
- Mari Matsunaga, founder of i-mode mobile service and Seiko Epson board director
- Masatoshi Matsunaga, Imperial Army Lieutenant General and Baron, Second Class
- Mitsuhiro Matsunaga (松永 光広; born 1966), Japanese professional wrestler
- Sadaichi Matsunaga, Imperial Japanese Navy Vice Admiral
- Seiji Matsunaga (松永 清志; born 1954), Japanese sport wrestler
- Spark Matsunaga, United States Senator from Hawaii
- Takuya Matsunaga (松永 拓也; born 1990), Japanese footballer
- Toh Matsunaga, Chairman of the 45th House of Representative
- Tomomitsu Matsunaga (松永 智充; born 1980), Japanese professional wrestler
- Yoshisuke Matsunaga, Japanese mathematician of the 18th century
- Yuki Matsunaga (松永 雪希), Japanese voice actress

== Fictional characters ==
- Baron Tsuneyoshi Matsunaga, Mameha's danna in Memoirs of a Geisha
- Mikage & Tomomi Matsunaga, the twin main characters from the manga series Miracle Girls
