= Association for the Defense of Minority Shareholders =

The Association for the Defense of Minority Shareholders (French: Association pour la défense des actionnaires minoritaires (ADAM)) is a French association created in 1991 whose purpose was to defend the collective interests of investors. Its headquarters is in Chartres. The association has around 5,000 members (3,000 according to L'Expansion in 2004), both individuals and large investors from all countries.

The association had successive lawyers Georges Berlioz, Alain Géniteau, a judicial administrator from Brest and Dominique Schmidt.

== History ==
Its first victory dates back to 1991, when Colette Neuville managed to obtain 84 million francs of indemnities for its members who were victims of the bankruptcy of the broker Tuffier. In 1998, Adam contested the methods of absorption of Havas from the General Water Company (French: Compagnie Générale des Eaux) and obtained from it nearly one billion euros additional for the Havas minority.

ADAM also intervened in the Vivendi-Havas cases in 1998, Schneider-Legrand in 2001 and Renault-Nissan in 2002 to criticize the terms of the merger between the French manufacturer and Nissan, too favorable to the Japanese according to it.

In the EADS affair, ADAM denounced the misleading information on the delay in delivery of the A380 which caused the share price to plunge by 26%. ADAM underlined the special role played by certain financial analysts at Morgan Stanley bank, which also received emoluments as advisor to the EADS group.

In addition to membership fees, in 2004, around fifteen institutional clients supported the association, including management companies like Richelieu Finance and Tocqueville Finance, the Anglo-Saxon hedge funds Centaurus and the Citadel Investment Group.
