= I-mode =

Japanese mobile internet service

i-mode iモード

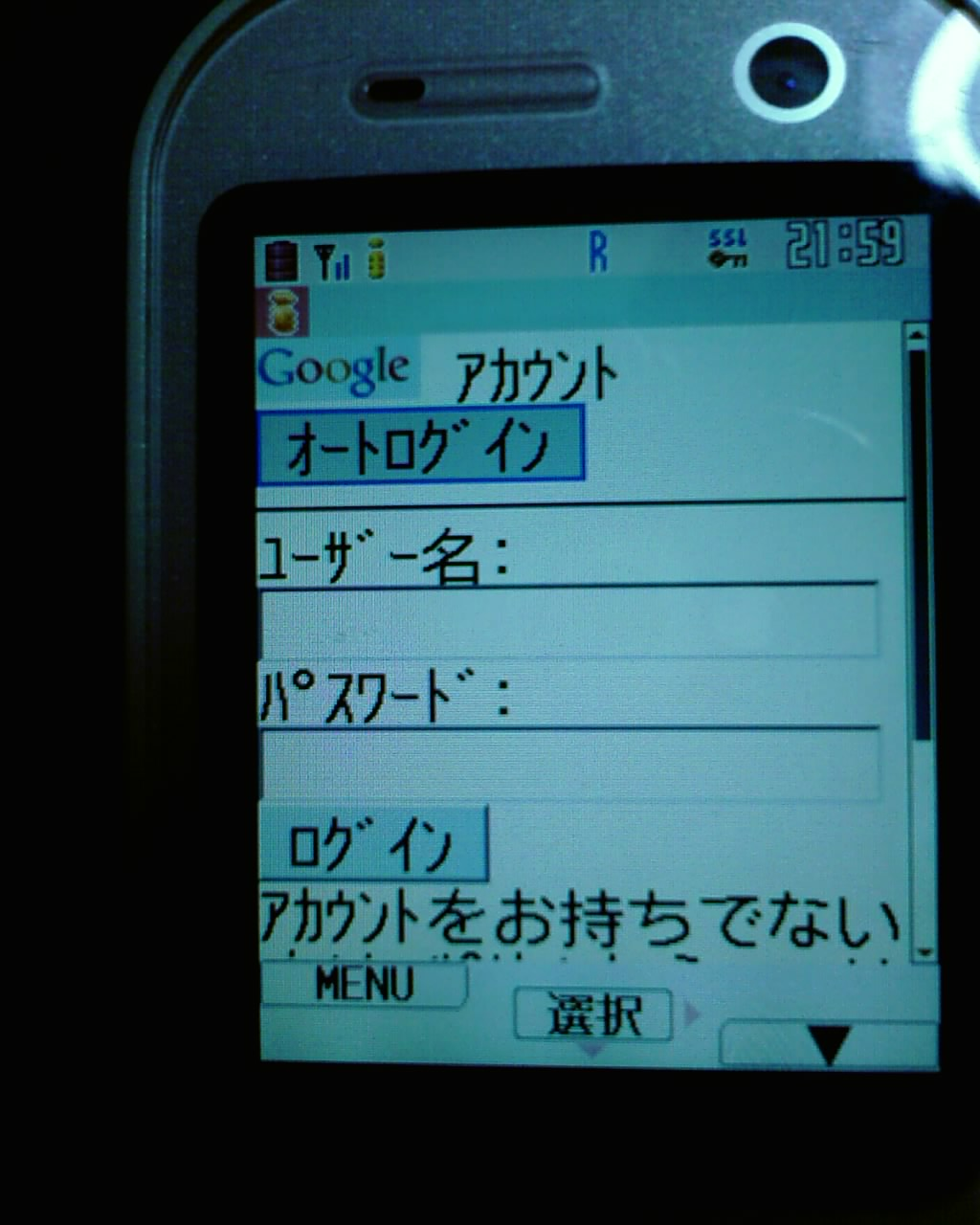
- Gmail on i-mode, 2007
- Developer: NTT Docomo
- Release: 22 February 1999; 27 years ago
- Engine: HTTP, TCP, UDP, C-HTML
- Operating system: See § Devices
- Type: Mobile web
- Website: nttdocomo.com/services/imode/index.html (Archived 5 March 2013)

i-mode (Japanese: iモード, ai-mōdo) was a Japanese mobile internet (distinct from wireless internet) service operated by NTT Docomo. Unlike Wireless Application Protocols (WAP), i-mode encompasses a wider variety of internet standards, including web access, e-mail, and the packet-switched network that delivers the data. i-mode users also have access to other various services such as: sports results, weather forecasts, games, financial services, and ticket booking. Content is provided by specialised services, typically from the mobile carrier, which allows them to have tighter control over billing.

Like WAP, i-mode delivers only those services that are specifically converted for the service, or are converted through gateways.

== Description ==
Evolution of mobile web standards

In contrast with the Wireless Application Protocol standard, which used Wireless Markup Language (WML) on top of a protocol stack for wireless handheld devices, i-mode borrows from DoCoMo proprietary protocols ALP (HTTP) and TLP (TCP, UDP), as well as fixed Internet data formats such as C-HTML, a subset of the HTML language designed by DoCoMo. C-HTML was designed for small devices (e.g. cellular phones) with hardware restrictions such as lower memory, low-power CPUs with limited or no storage capabilities, small monochrome display screens, single-character fonts and limited input methods. As a simpler form of HTML, C-HTML does not support tables, image maps, multiple fonts and styling of fonts, background colors and images, frames, or style sheets, and is limited to a monochromatic display.

i-mode phones have a special i-mode button for the user to access the start menu. There are more than 12,000 official sites and around 100,000 or more unofficial i-mode sites, which are not linked to DoCoMo's i-mode portal page and DoCoMo's billing services. NTT DoCoMo supervises the content and operations of all official i-mode sites, most of which are commercial. These official sites are accessed through DoCoMo's i-mode menu but in many cases official sites can also be accessed from mobile phones by typing the URL or through the use of QR code (a barcode).

An i-mode user pays for both sent and received data. There are services to avoid unsolicited e-mails. The basic monthly charge is typically on the order of ¥200–300 for i-mode not including the data transfer charges, with additional charges on a monthly subscription basis for premium services. A variety of discount plans exist, for example family discount and flat packet plans for unlimited transfer of data at a fixed monthly charge (on the order of ¥4,000 per month).

== History ==
i-mode was launched in Japan on 22 February 1999. The content planning and service design team was led by Mari Matsunaga, while Takeshi Natsuno was responsible for the business development. Top executive Keiichi Enoki oversaw the technical and overall development. A few months after DoCoMo launched i-mode in February 1999, DoCoMo's competitors launched very similar mobile data services: KDDI launched EZweb, and J-Phone launched J-Sky. Vodafone later acquired J-Phone including J-Sky, renaming the service Vodafone live!, although initially this was different from Vodafone live! in Europe and other markets. In addition, Vodafone KK was acquired by SoftBank, an operator of Yahoo! Japan in October, 2006 and changed the name to SoftBank Mobile.

Bandai and Namco launched content for i-mode in 1999. Bandai launched the Dokodemo Aso Vegas service in May 1999, reaching over 1 million paid subscribers by March 2000. In December 1999, Namco launched Namco Station, a mobile site for i-mode.

Since 2003, i-mode center is called CiRCUS, which consists of 400 NEC NX7000 HP-UX servers and occupies 4,600 m^{2} floor space in DoCoMo's Kawasaki office. The operation support system is called CARNiVAL, which is hosted in the Sanno Park Tower.

In June 2006, the mobile data services I-Mode, EZweb, and J-Sky, had over 80 million subscribers in Japan.

i-mode usage in Japan peaked around 2008. On 29 October 2019, DoCoMo announced that i-mode would end on 31 March 2026, after which it was discontinued.

== Markets ==
Seeing the tremendous success of i-mode in Japan, many operators in Europe, Asia and Australia sought to license the service through partnership with DoCoMo. Takeshi Natsuno was behind the expansion of i-mode to 17 countries worldwide. Kamel Maamria who was a partner with the Boston Consulting Group and who was supporting Mr. Natsuno is also thought to have had a major role in the expansion of the first Japanese service ever outside Japan.

i-mode showed very fast take-up in the various countries where it was launched which led to more operators seeking to launch i-mode in their markets with the footprint reaching a total of 17 markets worldwide.

While the i-mode service was an exceptional service which positioned DoCoMo as the global leader in value add services, another key success factor for i-mode was the Japanese smartphone makers who developed state of the art handsets to support i-mode. As i-mode was exported to the rest of the world, Nokia and other major handset vendors who controlled the markets at the time, refused at first to support i-mode by developing handsets which did not support the i-mode service. The operators who decided to launch i-mode had to rely on Japanese vendors who had no experience in international markets. As i-mode showed success in these markets, some vendors started customizing some of their handsets to support i-mode, however, the support was only partial and came late in time.

While the service was successful during the first years after launch, the lack of adequate handsets and the emergence of new handsets from new vendors which supported new Internet services on one hand, and a change of leadership of i-mode in Docomo, led to a number of operators to migrate or integrate i-mode into new mobile Internet services. These efforts were ultimately unsuccessful, and i-mode never became popular outside of Japan.

i-mode sponsored the Renault F1 team from 2004 to 2006.

i-mode was launched in the following countries:

- Australia (Telstra)
- Belgium (Base)
- Bulgaria (Globul)
- France (Bouygues Télécom)
- Germany (E-Plus)
- Greece (Cosmote)
- Hong Kong (3)
- Ireland (O2)
- Israel (Cellcom)
- Italy (Wind)
- Netherlands (KPN)
- Romania (Cosmote Romania)
- Russia (MTS)
- Singapore (StarHub)
- Spain (Telefónica)
- Taiwan (FarEasTone)
- UK (O2)

== Devices ==
Some typical features include the "clamshell" model with large displays (240 x 320 pixels) and in many models, a display on either side. Additionally several phones had extra features not typically found on other clamshell phones of the era, like digital cameras. The displays normally have 65,536 colors and later models had as many as 262,144 colors.

- FOMA SA800i
- Fujitsu F905i (one of the very few Japanese i-mode phones to be sold outside Japan)
- LG KE390i
- LG L342i
- LG L343i
- LG L852i (PRADA)
- Mitsubishi M342i
- Motorola RAZR V3xx with i-mode
- Motorola SLVR L6 i-mode
- Motorola SLVR L7 i-mode
- NEC N21i
- NEC N22i
- NEC N343i
- NEC 411i
- Nokia N70 i-mode
- Nokia N95i
- Nokia 6120 classic
- Nokia 6124 classic
- Samsung S400i
- Samsung S500i
- Samsung Z320i
- Sony Ericsson K550im
- Sony Ericsson K610im

== See also ==
- Mobile browser
- Information appliance
- Smartphone
- Japanese mobile phone culture
- Mobile game
