= Sony Ericsson K550 =

Cell phone model

Sony Ericsson K550i
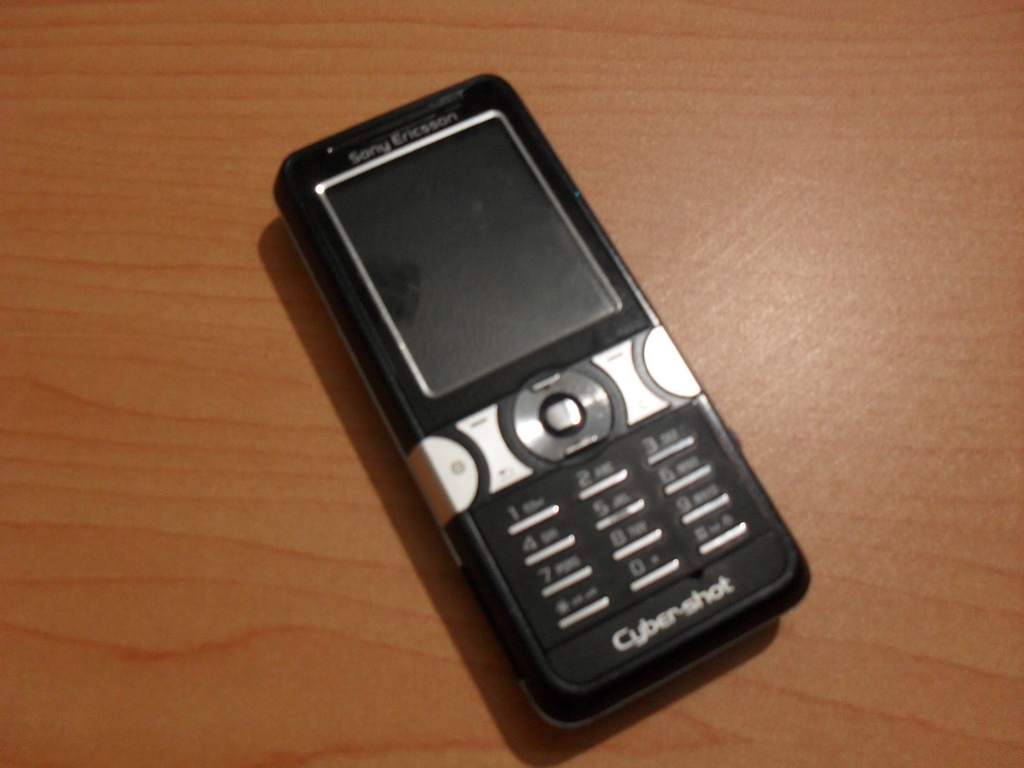
- Compatible networks: EDGE, GSM 850, GSM 900, GSM 1800, GSM 1900
- Dimensions: 102×46×14.5 mm (4.02×1.81×0.57 in)
- Weight: 85 g (3 oz)
- Memory: 64 MB internal, Memory Stick Micro support
- Display: 176x220 px, 262,144 color TFD LCD
- Connectivity: EDGE, GPRS, HSCSD, Bluetooth v2.0, USB 2, IrDA

The Sony Ericsson K550 is a mid-range mobile phone. Announced on February 6, 2007, it was the successor of the K510 model sensor with two-LED photolight and an active lens cover for the camera lens protection and easy camera activation when taking pictures from the phone. The phone has a variant in the form of K550im which was the first i-mode enabled phone bearing the Cyber-shot logo, trying to build into the success of the Sony Ericsson K610im model. The phone was one of the first Sony Ericsson models in which the user can find the Fast-Port system connector on the left side instead of the typical bottom part.

== Technical features ==
- Estimated CPU class: ARM9 201 MHz
- 2-megapixel (1632 x 1224 pixels) camera with autofocus, 2 LED Photolight, active lens cover
- 2.25x digital zoom
- Quad-band GPRS/EDGE support
- Web browser
- MP3, WMA/AAC playback
- 77 MB internal memory, expandable with memory stick micro slot up to 2 GB
- FM radio with RDS and track ID music recognition
- Bluetooth 2.0 with support for stereo sound output (A2DP)
- Java MIDP 2.0 based from Sony Ericsson's Java Platform 7
- Real multitasking (runs up to 5 Java applications at one time)
- SAR 1.25 W/kg (10g)
- 262k color TFD LCD (thin film diode) 176 x 220 pixels
- Li-Po 950 mAh (standby time of 350 hours, 7 hours of talk time)

=== Design ===
The K550i design is similar to other models in the cyber-shot range, but it is slimmer than some other K series phones (such as the K790 and K800). Its keyboard layout is also redesigned relative to those models.

== Modifications ==
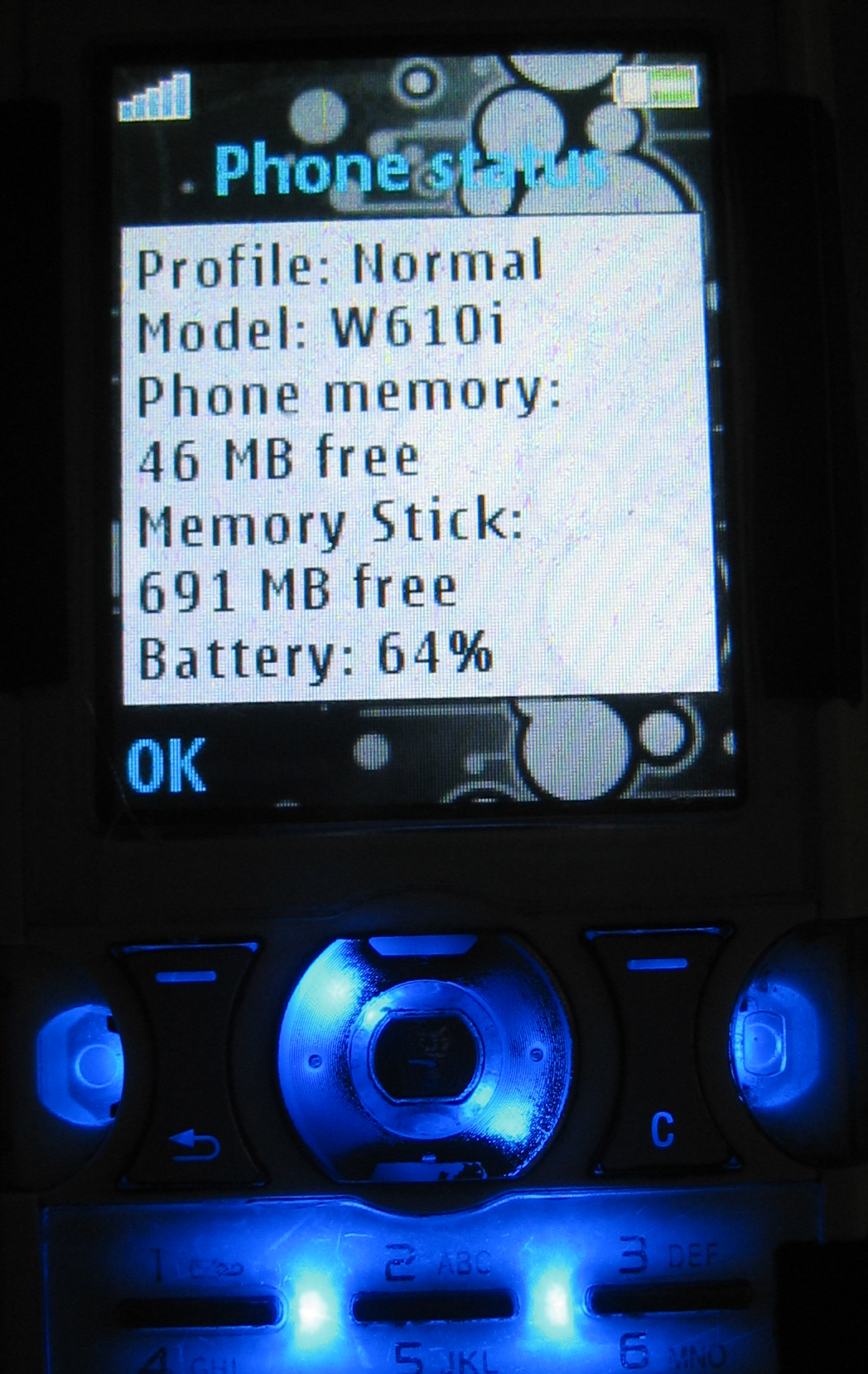
K550i whose firmware has been flashed to W610i showing status

Just like its fellow Sony Ericsson models since the K750/W800/W810, the K550 can be modified in various ways (such as modifying its camera driver to improve camera image quality or acoustic driver for better sound reproduction). Tutorial on changing the Camdriver These two modifications are easily the most popular modifications available for the K550 user as well as other Sony Ericsson model users. The phone menu can also be modified, enabling changing menu icons, layouts, and even the media player background. A Sony Ericsson W610 housing fits the K550, since hardware-wise the two are identical. It is also possible to flash the K550 with W610 firmware which features Walkman 2.0 and flash menus pre-installed, but features like the slide shutter which is native to the K550i will not be available in the flashed version considering the W610i does not support the architecture.Tutorial on flashing a K550 to W610
