= Katsuyo Kobayashi =

Japanese celebrity chef

Katsuyo Kobayashi (小林 カツ代, Kobayashi Katsuyo; October 24, 1937 – January 23, 2014) was a Japanese celebrity chef, food writer, and founder/leader of the charity "Kagurazaka Women's Choir".

== Biography ==
Katsuyo Kobayashi was born in Osaka in 1937. A graduate of Tezukayama Gakuin University, she became a homemaker after marriage. When she got married at the age of 21, she couldn't cook although she was a homemaker.

She started learning how to cook from her mother and neighbors who could cook well. In 1963, initiated by a letter to a TV program, her career as a gourmet scholar started: she got her own TV program at the local television station in Osaka. In 1970, she debuted as an essayist, and published many cookbooks and essays. She appeared on NHK's cooking programs such as “Kyou no Ryouri (Today’s Dinner)” for 26 years and received public attention. She also created household products. Her serving dish “Kiai” was awarded the Good Design Award by the Japan Institute of Design Promotion Organization, which is instituted by the Ministry of International Trade and Industry of Japan, in 1990. In addition, her English cookbook “The Quick and Easy Japanese Cookbook” was awarded the Best Cookbook in Asia by the Gourmand World Cookbook Award in 2000. She published nearly 200 cookbooks and essays and she also supported people who are living in the disaster areas of the Great Hanshin-Awaji earthquake in 1995.

In 1994, she participated in the TV cooking contest Iron Chef, winning against Chen Kenichi.

In 2000 she founded the Kagurazaka Women's Choir, a choir consisting of celebrities performing for charity events.

Kobayashi, whose son Kentarō is also a celebrity chef, published more than 200 books.

A strong believer in Article 9 of the Japanese Constitution, she was one of the founders of Magazine 9.

After suffering a subarachnoid hemorrhage in 2005, she died on January 23, 2014, of multiple organ failure.
