= Tetsuro Aikawa =

Japanese businessman

- 相川 哲郎
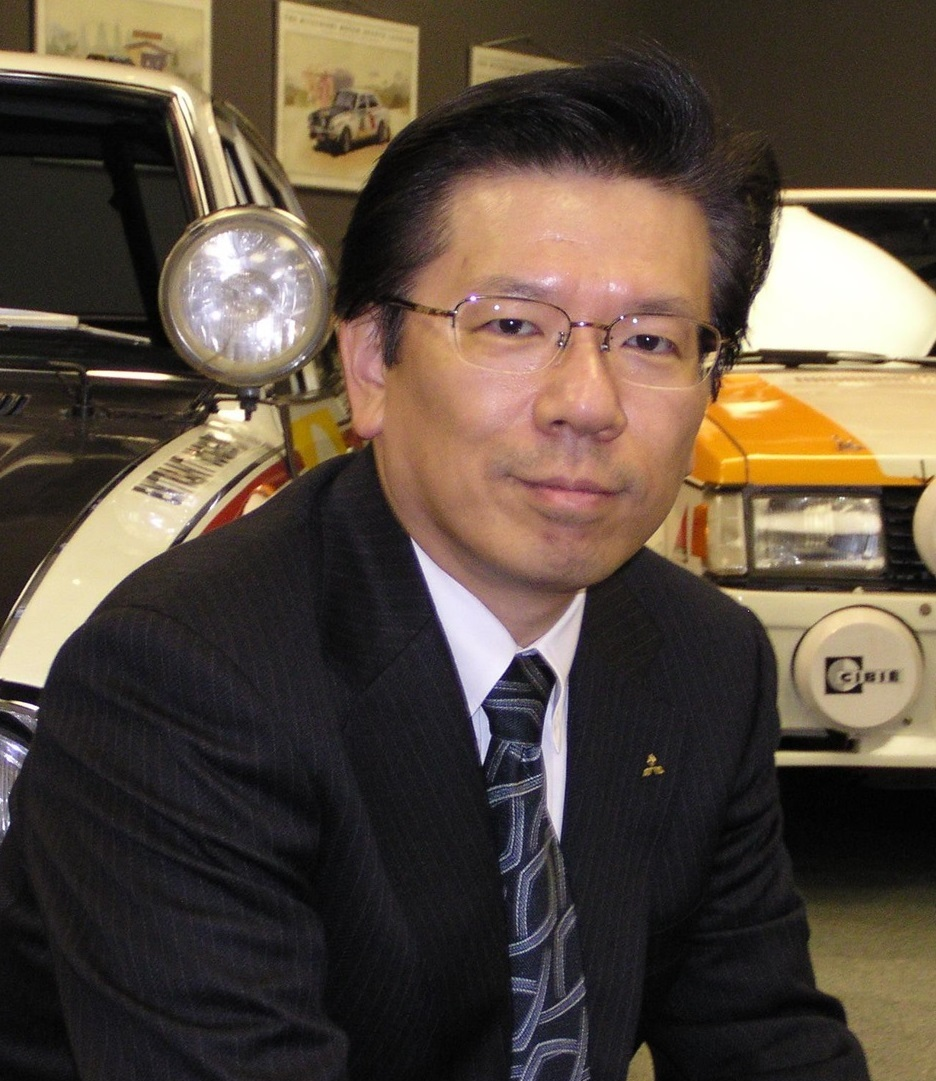
- Born: 17 April 1954 (age 72); Japan
- Occupation: Businessman
- Known for: Resigning over the 2016 Mitsubishi fuel economy scandal
- Title: President and COO of Mitsubishi Motors
- Term: 25 June 2014 – June 2016
- Predecessor: Osamu Masuko
- Successor: Osamu Masuko

Tetsuro Aikawa (born 17 April 1954) is a Japanese businessman, the president, chief operating officer (COO) and a representative director of Mitsubishi Motors Corporation (MMC) since 25 June 2014.

In April 2016, Aikawa led the announcement that Mitsubishi Motors had falsified fuel economy data for more than 600,000 vehicles made for Nissan and sold in Japan. Aikawa said that he was personally unaware, yet felt responsible. Bloomberg reported that Aikawa and other MMC executives attended meetings where fuel economy targets for the affected minicars were raised. During development of those minicars, the fuel economy targets were raised five times in two years, from an initial target of 26.4 km per liter to 29.2 km (18.14 miles) per liter.

In May 2016, Mitsubishi Motors announced Aikawa to resign as the president of the company with effect from June. Both Mitsubishi Motors and Aikawa denied any top management involvement in the mileage scandal.
