= Samsung S400i =

Mobile phone released in 2006

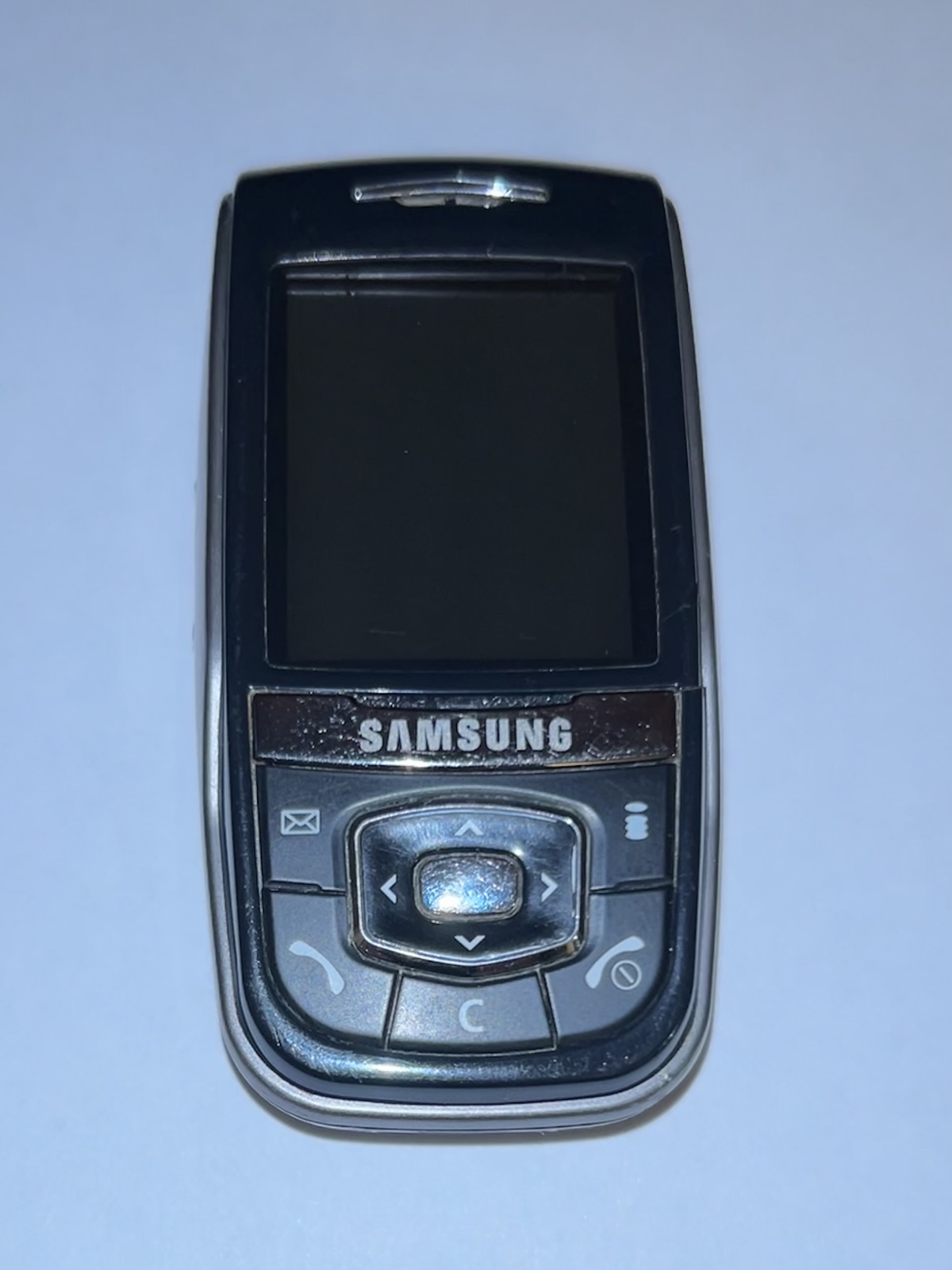
- Manufacturer: Samsung
- Availability by region: February 2006
- Compatible networks: GSM
- Form factor: Slider
- Dimensions: 91×45×21 mm (3.58×1.77×0.83 in)
- Weight: 88 g (3 oz)
- Storage: 13 MB
- Battery: 900 mAh Li-ion
- Rear camera: 0.3 MP, VGA
- Display: 1.8 inch, 176x220 px
- Connectivity: Bluetooth
- Model: SGH-S400i
- SAR: 0.36 W/kg (head)

The Samsung S400i is a slider mobile phone released by Samsung in 2006. It features a 0.3 megapixel camera with a LED flash and video recording functionality. It can be connected via USB with a proprietary cable or via Bluetooth. Headphones also connect through a dedicated proprietary port. The display is a TFT 256K color, 176 x 220 pixels. The only color available was black.

== Features ==
- VGA 0.3 MP rear camera, with video recording, portrait mirror and LED flash
- Up to 3 hours of talk time, up to 150 hours of standby time
- DoJa 2.5 support
- SMS, MMS, Email
- i-mode web browser
- Triband GSM 900/1800/1900
- GPRS and EDGE support
- AAC/M4A player
- T9 predictive text input
- Bluetooth 1.1 connectivity
- Organizer and voice memos
- Polyphonic ringtones and vibration
- T9 predictive text input

== Reception ==
The Samsung S400i was seen as having poor specifications in some areas, the storage space of 13 MB was seen as too small, and the camera was only 0.3 MP. Reviewers praised it for being compact and comfortable to hold, its design, the clear and loud calls and the battery life, saying it can last a couple of days of heavy usage. User reviews saw the phone as being good as a first phone, but also did not like the storage space, the camera, the fact that it lacked a MP3 player, and its Bluetooth features. It was also considered to be easy to use, to be a good value for money, and have a good display.
