= Renault–Nissan–Mitsubishi Alliance =

French-Japanese strategic alliance

Alliance logo

The Renault–Nissan–Mitsubishi Alliance, originally known as the Renault–Nissan Alliance, is a French-Japanese strategic alliance between the automobile manufacturers Renault (based in Boulogne-Billancourt, Île-de-France, France), Nissan (based in Yokohama, Kanagawa, Japan) and Mitsubishi Motors (based in Minato, Tokyo, Japan), which together sell more than one in nine vehicles worldwide. Renault and Nissan have been strategic partners since 1999, have nearly 450,000 employees, and control eight major brands: Renault, Nissan, Mitsubishi, Infiniti, Renault Korea, Dacia, Alpine, and Venucia. The car group sold 10.6 million vehicles worldwide in 2017, making it the leading light vehicle manufacturing group in the world. The Alliance adopted its current name in September 2017, one year after Nissan acquired a controlling interest in Mitsubishi and subsequently made Mitsubishi an equal partner in the Alliance.

As of December 2021, the Alliance is one of the world's leading electric vehicle manufacturing groups, with global sales of over 1 million light-duty electric vehicles since 2009. The top selling vehicles of its EV line-up are the Nissan Leaf and the Renault Zoe all-electric cars.

The strategic partnership between Renault, Nissan and Mitsubishi is not a merger or an acquisition. The three companies are joined through a cross-sharing agreement. The structure was unique in the auto industry during the 1990s consolidation trend and later served as a model for General Motors and the PSA Group, as well as the Volkswagen Group and Suzuki, though many of these capital alliances failed or only lasted for a few years. The Alliance itself has broadened its scope substantially, forming additional partnerships with automakers including Germany's Daimler and China's Dongfeng.

Following the November 2018 arrest and imprisonment of Alliance chairman and CEO Carlos Ghosn, accompanied by his dismissal from the alliance and its components, press analysts have questioned both the stability of the Alliance's shareholding agreement and its long-term existence. These analysts also note that, because the companies' recent business strategies are interdependent, attempts to restructure the Alliance could be counter-productive for all of the members.

In January 2023, Renault and Nissan moved to restructure their alliance in order to recover from Ghosn's arrest and manage through a post-Covid economy. The primary objective was to give both companies more autonomy.

== Corporate structure and strategy ==
The Alliance is a strategic partnership based on the rationale that, due to substantial cross-shareholding investments, each company acts in the financial interest of the other—while maintaining individual brand identities and independent corporate cultures. For many years, Renault had a 43.4% voting stake in Nissan and Nissan held a 15% non-voting stake in Renault, effectively giving Renault control. In 2023, Renault reduced its 43.3% voting stake in Nissan to 15% and Nissan will now be able to vote with its 15% stake in Renault. Although more companies have adopted such an arrangement, it remains controversial. Some business journalists have speculated that the companies should be joined in a conventional merger to make a "bold" move, while other interested parties have said that the companies should separate.

Carlos Ghosn, the founding chairman and CEO of the Alliance, is a Brazilian-Lebanese-French businessman who was also chairman and CEO of Nissan Motors until November 2018 and held the same positions at Renault for two months longer. Ghosn compared the Renault–Nissan partnership to a marriage: "A couple does not assume a converged, single identity when they get married. Instead, they retain their own individuality and join to build a life together, united by shared interests and goals, each bringing something different to the union. In business, regardless of the industry, the most successful and enduring partnerships are those created with a respect for identity as the constant guiding principle."

Ghosn consistently advocated an evolutionary approach that results in increasing integration and synergies for partners within the Alliance. "You have to be careful that at the end of the day, by trying to do more in the short-term you don't end up destroying what had been delivering so much result on the mid-term and long-term," Ghosn was quoted as saying in a March 2011 Reuters Special Report, in which he said conventional, top-down acquisitions in the auto industry in the past decade have failed. "It is not validated by any example in the car industry that this works. Not one example. And saying something different is just rubbish."

According to public statements, the goal of the Alliance was to increase economies of scale for both Renault and Nissan without forcing one company's identity to be consumed by the other's. After forming, the Alliance achieved its scale and also sped time to market by jointly developing engines, batteries and other key components. For instance, Nissan's market share increases in Europe's competitive light commercial vehicle segment have been partly a result of badging various Renault van models such as the Renault Kangoo/Nissan Kubistar, Renault Master/Nissan Interstar, Renault Trafic/Nissan Primastar. In addition, Renault built nearly all of the diesel engines in Nissan cars sold in Europe. Nissan used these engines to accelerate sales throughout Europe, where it was at one point the number one Asian brand in many key markets.

Collaboration between Renault and Nissan also focuses on capital-intensive research projects such as sustainable, zero-emission transportation and development of automobile manufacturing in emerging markets such as Brazil, Russia and India. The Alliance also oversees purchasing for both companies, ensuring larger volume and thus better pricing with suppliers. Renault and Nissan have also consolidated logistics operations under the Alliance to reduce costs. The companies claim that they generate more than €200 million per year by sharing warehouses, containers, shipping crates, seagoing vessels and customs-related processing. In total, the Alliance reported more than €1.5 billion in synergies in 2010.

The Alliance develops "best practices," borrowing systems and controls from one company to strengthen the other company where appropriate. The "Nissan Production Way" became the cornerstone of the "Système de Production Renault" standard used by all Renault plants. Renault reported productivity increasing by 15 percent due to the new system.

== History ==
The Alliance began on 27 March 1999. At the time, the auto industry was in a period of rapid consolidation. Numerous companies merged or were acquired in high-profile deals, most notably Daimler's merger with Chrysler in 1998 (which dissolved in 2007, when the companies separated).

At the time it was created, Renault bought 36.8% of Nissan's outstanding stock for $3.5 billion pending court approval and Nissan vowed to buy into Renault when it was financially able. In 2001, after the company's turnaround from near-bankruptcy, Nissan took a 15% stake in Renault, which in turn increased its stake in Nissan to 43.4%.

In 2002, the Alliance created the Renault–Nissan BV (RNBV), a strategic management company to oversee areas such as corporate governance between the two companies. Based in Amsterdam, it is owned 50/50 by Renault and Nissan and provides a neutral location for the Alliance to exchange ideas, build strategy and help leverage the maximum synergies between the two companies.

In 2006, the Alliance began exploratory talks with General Motors regarding the possibility of creating an industrial alliance. The talks were instigated by GM minority shareholder Kirk Kerkorian. GM reportedly demanded payment of several billion dollars to engage in an alliance, prompting Ghosn to call the terms "contrary to the spirit of an alliance." Discussions ended without agreement in October 2006, when Ghosn said, "It's clear the two sides have completely different appetites for an alliance."

Since 2010, the Alliance has undertaken a number of projects as part of a strategic cooperation deal with the German Daimler AG company.

In 2014, Renault and Nissan combined various research and development, manufacturing and business operations to increase money savings, integrate the two companies and accelerate development.

In May 2016, in the wake of the fuel-efficiency scandal uncovered by Nissan, Nissan began the acquisition of a 34% stake in Mitsubishi Motors, with the aim of making Nissan the largest and controlling shareholder of Mitsubishi and turning Mitsubishi Motors into a member of the Renault–Nissan Alliance (the "Alliance"). Nissan has said that they plan to share some car platforms and jointly develop future vehicles with Mitsubishi Motors. Nissan's acquisition of the 34% controlling interest in Mitsubishi was completed in October 2016, when Carlos Ghosn, the chairman of Nissan, Renault, and the Alliance, also became chairman of Mitsubishi. Ghosn remained chairman of Mitsubishi until his dismissal following his arrest by the Japanese government in November 2018, when Mitsubishi CEO Osamu Masuko assumed the chairmanship.

In September 2017, the Alliance announced its six-year plan "Alliance 2022" that set a new target to double annual synergies to €10 billion by the end of the plan. Carlos Ghosn said: “Today marks a new milestone for our member companies. By the end of our strategic plan Alliance 2022, we aim to double our annual synergies to €10 billion. To achieve this target, on one side Renault, Nissan and Mitsubishi Motors will accelerate collaboration on common platforms, powertrains and next-generation electric, autonomous and connected technologies. From the other side, synergies will be enhanced by our growing scale. Our total annual sales are forecast to exceed 14 million units, generating revenues expected at $240 billion by the end of the plan.” Beside the announcement of the new plan, the new logo and the new name of the Alliance had been launched.

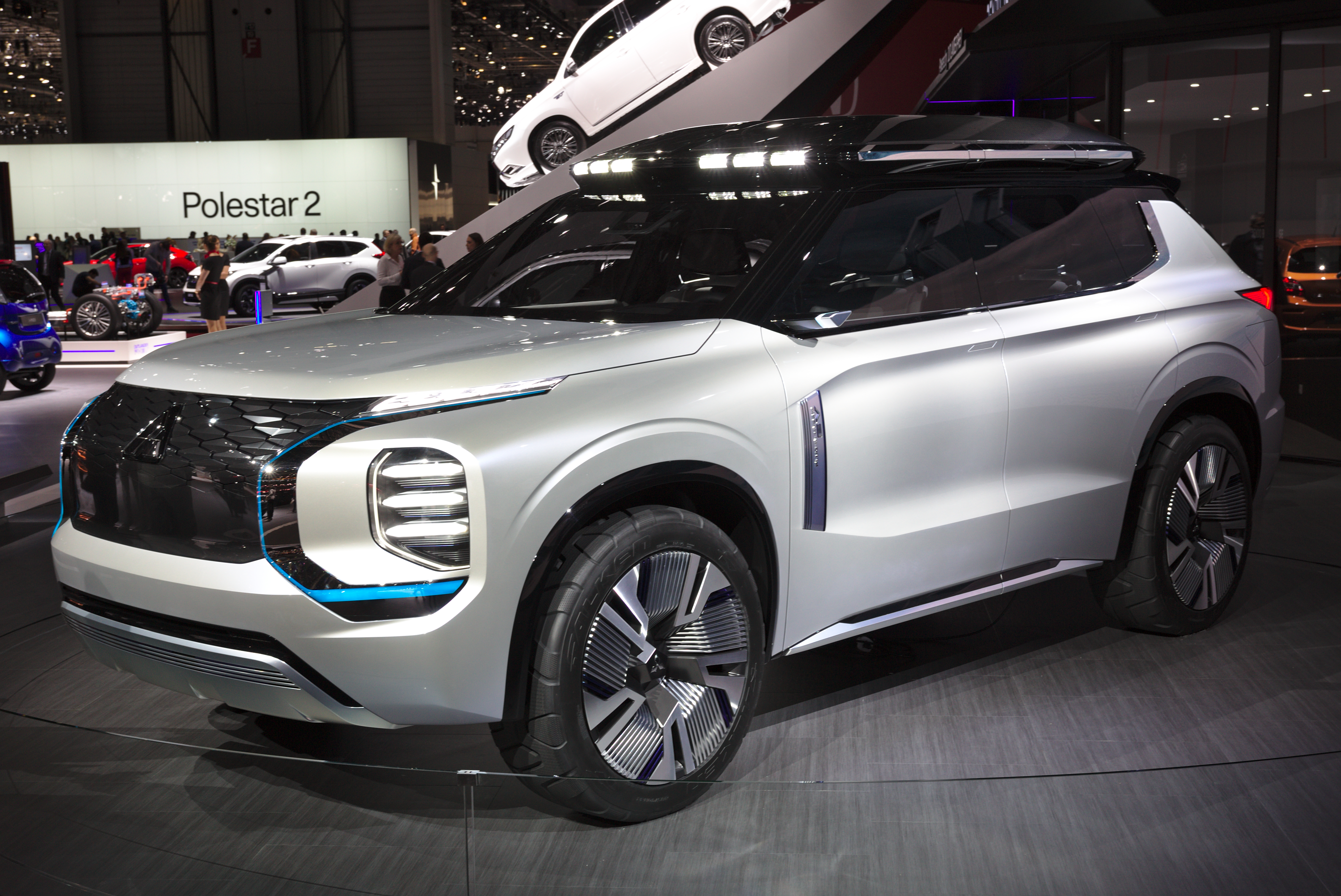
Mitsubishi Engelberg Tourer Concept, the first vehicle was based on Nissan X-Trail/Nissan Rogue produced in Japan, developing car platforms are stopped by 2026. Previewed the styling of fourth generation Mitsubishi Outlander (pictured).

In September 2021, Mitsubishi Motors plans to end the development of car platforms for the Japanese market and instead use vehicle bases made by ally Nissan Motor beginning around 2026 as the auto industry requires huge investments in technology.

=== Conflict over control ===
Although Nissan is larger and slightly more profitable than Renault, the latter has a theoretical control over the Alliance due to its significant voting stake in Nissan and its Nissan board seats (contrasted with Nissan's non-voting stake in Renault). In addition, the single largest shareholder in Renault is the French government, which may have the effect of placing Nissan policy under French government control and has contributed to resentment over the terms of the Alliance within both Nissan and Japan. To strengthen French shareholder control over French companies, France passed the "Florange law" in 2014 that automatically doubled the voting power of long-term shareholders unless the company opted out, which gave France's 15% stake in Renault significantly more voting power and control rights. In April 2015, Renault brought a measure to opt out of the "Florange law" to a shareholder vote. However, the French government, led by the then Minister of the Economy and Finance and later the President Emmanuel Macron, made a short-term purchase of an additional €1.23 billion of shares in Renault to enable it to defeat the opt-out, which was widely seen as a corporate raid by the French government.

In response, Nissan second-in-command Hiroto Saikawa threatened to have Nissan exit the Alliance unless Renault did the following: sell down its controlling Nissan stake, restore voting rights to Nissan's holding in Renault, and relinquish control of the Alliance. Macron and France ignored the demands, figuring that they could reach a deal with Ghosn that was tied to an extension of his leadership of Renault. To alleviate the tension, Renault entered into a binding pledge never to oppose the Nissan board at a company shareholder meeting.

In early 2018, Ghosn discussed making the Alliance "irreversible" and began talks to merge Renault and Nissan, which would have kept them both under his (and French) control, with Mitsubishi to join the merged company later. However, Ghosn's November 2018 arrest in Japan and dismissal from both Nissan and Mitsubishi, which left Saikawa in charge of Nissan, immediately ramped up the tensions between the Japanese companies and the French government, which was given no advance notice of the pending arrest.

After Ghosn's departure from Nissan, Nissan stated that it was denied the opportunity to present evidence of Ghosn's malfeasance to Renault's board. Subsequently, Macron and the French government have reportedly informed the Japanese that they want the merger between Renault and Nissan to go forward and that they want to name Nissan's next chairman. In response, Nissan CEO Saikawa said that this was not the right time to discuss future capital ties between Nissan and Renault.

Despite the conflict, each of the companies has reaffirmed its commitment to the Alliance; for example, Mitsubishi CEO Osamu Masuko said that the Alliance was essential "if we consider the many challenges the auto industry faces. I’ve never thought for once that it was a mistake to join" the Alliance. Nissan and Renault have also repeatedly said that dissolving the Alliance is not an option for either company.

On 12 March 2019, the three Alliance companies signed a memorandum of understanding for creating a "Alliance operating board" with Jean-Dominique Senard as chairman and the CEOs from the three companies as equal members.

== Global sales ==
According to the Alliance, it sold one in nine cars worldwide in 2017, ranking as the world's largest producer of light vehicles by sales, with 10,608,366 units sold. In 2017, the Renault-Nissan-Mitsubishi alliance recorded an increase of 6.5% compared to 2016.

Year	2011	2012	2013	2014	2015	2016	2017	2018
Renault	2,722,062	2,550,286	2,628,208	2,712,432	2,801,592	3,182,625	3,761,634	3,884,295
Nissan	4,669,981	4,940,133	5,102,979	5,310,064	5,421,804	5,559,902	5,816,278	5,653,683
Mitsubishi						934,013	1,030,454	1,218,897
AvtoVAZ	637,179	606,778	533,634	448,114	305,491	284,807	figures merged to Renault	
Total	8,029,222	8,097,197	8,264,821	8,470,610	8,528,887	9,961,347	10,608,366	10,756,875

== Projects ==
=== Zero-emission vehicles ===
Renault–Nissan–Mitsubishi Alliance Zero-emission vehicles milestones (2009 – 2020)
Date	Milestone
Jul 2009	Mitsubishi i-MiEV, the first highway legal series production electric car, was launched.
Dec 2010	Nissan Leaf was launched in the U.S. and Japan.
Oct 2011	Renault Kangoo Z.E. utility van was released in Europe.
2011	Nissan Leaf surpassed the Mitsubishi i-MiEV as the best selling all-electric car in history.
Mar 2012	Renault Twizy was released in France.
Dec 2012	Renault Zoe was released in France.
Feb 2013	Nissan Leaf global sales reached 50,000 units.
Jul 2013	Alliance global EV sales reached 100,000 units.
Sep 2013	Kangoo Z.E. global sales passed 10,000 units.
Jan 2014	Nissan Leaf global sales reached 100,000 units.
Jun 2014	Nissan e-NV200 utility van was released in Europe.
Oct 2014	Alliance global EV sales passed 200,000 units.
Apr 2015	Renault Twizy global sales reached 15,000 units.
May 2015	Renault Zoe global sales passed 25,000 units.
Jun 2015	Alliance global EV sales reached 250,000 units.
Dec 2015	Nissan Leaf global sales passed 200,000 units.
Dec 2015	Alliance global EV sales passed 300,000 units.
Jun 2016	Renault Zoe global sales passed 50,000 units.
Aug 2016	Alliance global EV sales reached 350,000 units.
Dec 2016	Nissan Leaf global sales passed 250,000 units.
Jan 2017	Alliance global EV sales reached 400,000 units.
Oct 2017	Alliance global EV sales reached 500,000 units.
Jan 2018	Nissan Leaf global sales passed 300,000 units.
Mar 2019	Nissan Leaf global sales reached 400,000 units.
Jun 2019	Renault Zoe global sales passed 150,000 units.
Dec 2019	Renault Zoe production reached 200,000 units.
Dec 2019	Alliance global EV sales reached 800,000 units.
Dec 2020	Nissan Leaf global sales reached 500,000 units.
Dec 2021	Alliance global EV sales passed 1 million mark.

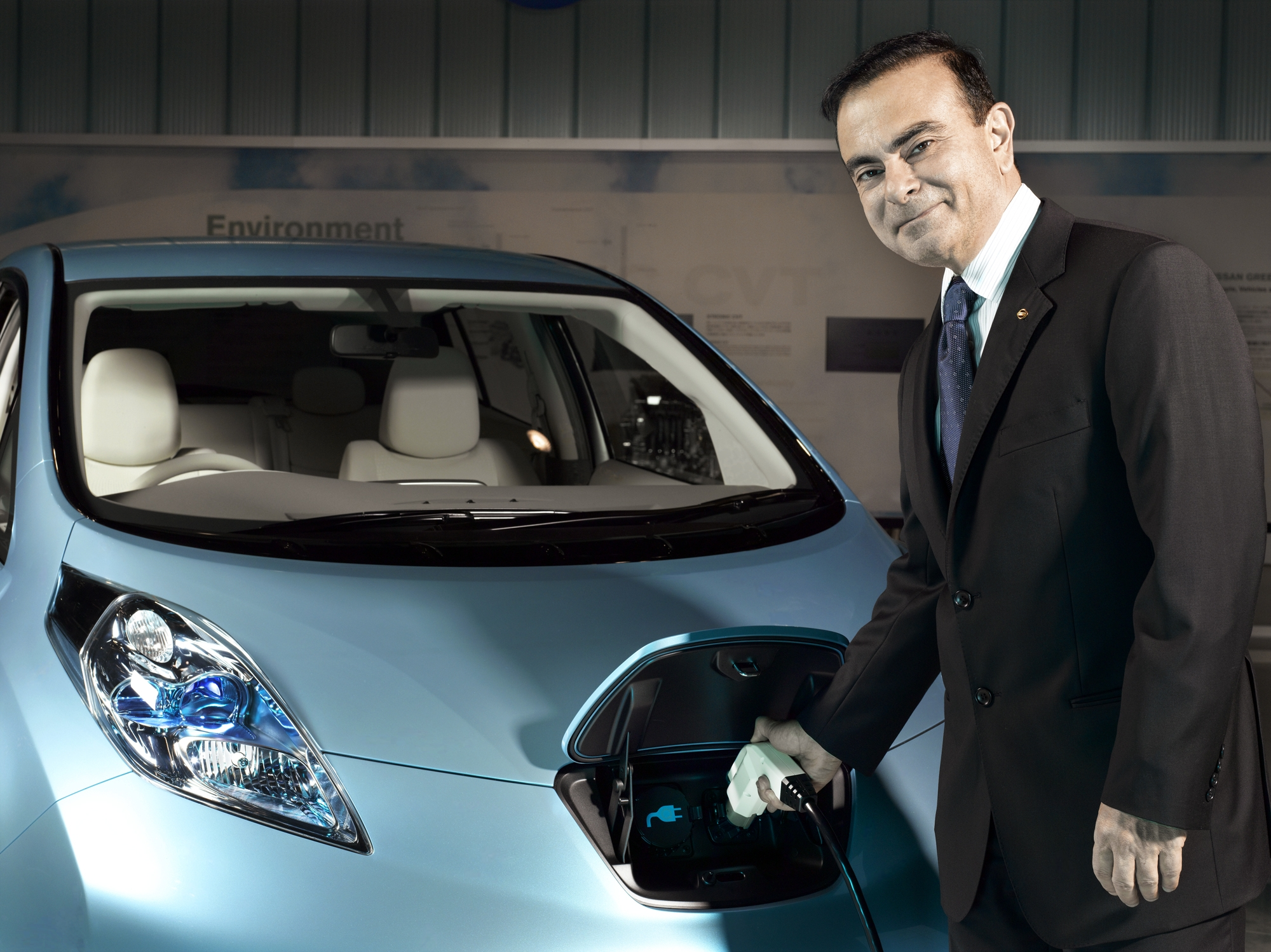
Carlos Ghosn charges a Nissan Leaf, one of six zero-emission vehicles developed by the Renault–Nissan Alliance as of December 2016.

The Alliance committed €4 billion (around US$5.2 billion) into its electric vehicle and battery development programs with the aim to become the leader in zero-emission transportation. Carlos Ghosn, Chairman and CEO of the Renault–Nissan Alliance predicted that by 2020 one in 10 new car sales will be an electric vehicle. The first electric car based on this investment was the Nissan Leaf, launched in December 2010 in the United States and Japan. Between 2011 and 2013, Renault launched four zero-emissions (Z.E.) battery electric vehicles (BEVs), the Renault Kangoo Z.E. utility van, Renault Fluence Z.E., Renault Zoe and the Renault Twizy urban quadricycle. Zero-emissions refers to no CO_{2} emissions and no regulated exhaust pollutants while driving, that is, no tailpipe pollutants. Nissan's second all-electric vehicle, the Nissan e-NV200, was released in Europe in June 2014, followed by Japan in October 2014. Nissan plans to launch two additional battery electric vehicles by March 2017. Initially, Carlos Ghosn predicted the two companies would sell a combined 1.5 million electric cars as early as 2016. As sales were slower than expected, in 2013 the Alliance revised its sales target to 1.5 million electric vehicles by 2020.

In May 2008, as part of the Alliance's zero emission strategy, Nissan and NEC formed a joint-venture company, Automotive Energy Supply Corporation (AESC) to focus on the development and mass production of advanced lithium-ion batteries for a wide range of automotive applications from hybrids, electric vehicles to fuel-cell vehicles. AESC began production in 2009 at its facility at Nissan's Zama plant in Kanagawa Prefecture where annual capacity is 65,000 units. Globally, Alliance battery production capacity is expected to be 500,000 units a year by the end of 2013. Other Alliance battery production sites, announced in 2009, include France, Portugal, the UK and the U.S.

The Alliance has created partnerships with more than 100 public and private organizations to create consumer buying incentives and EV infrastructure investment. The Alliance also partnered with Better Place. After implementing the first modern commercial deployment of the battery swapping model in Israel and Denmark, Better Place filed for bankruptcy in Israel in May 2013.

Global sales

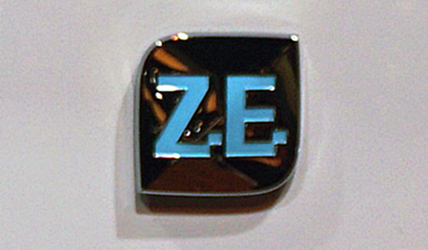
Renault's Zero-Emissions (Z.E.) badge

Combined sales of Renault and Nissan models achieved the sales milestone of 400,000 all-electric vehicles delivered globally in January 2017. Groupe Renault global electric vehicle sales passed the 100,000 unit milestone in September 2016, with Zoe sales representing 54%, the Kangoo Z.E. with 24%, and the Twizy with 18%.

Nissan global electric vehicle sales passed 275,000 units in December 2016. By the end of December 2017, the Alliance achieved the sales milestone of more than 500,000 electric vehicles delivered globally, including those manufactured by Mitsubishi Motors, now part of the Alliance, and ranked as the world's top selling all-electric vehicle manufacturer.

As of December 2021, the Renault–Nissan–Mitsubishi Alliance continued to be one of the world's leading all-electric vehicle manufacturers, with all-electric global sales totaling over 1 million light-duty electric vehicles, including those manufactured by Mitsubishi Motors since 2009. The Alliance listed as the world's leading all-electric vehicle manufacturer until surpassed in early 2020 by Tesla, with about 900,000 electric cars.

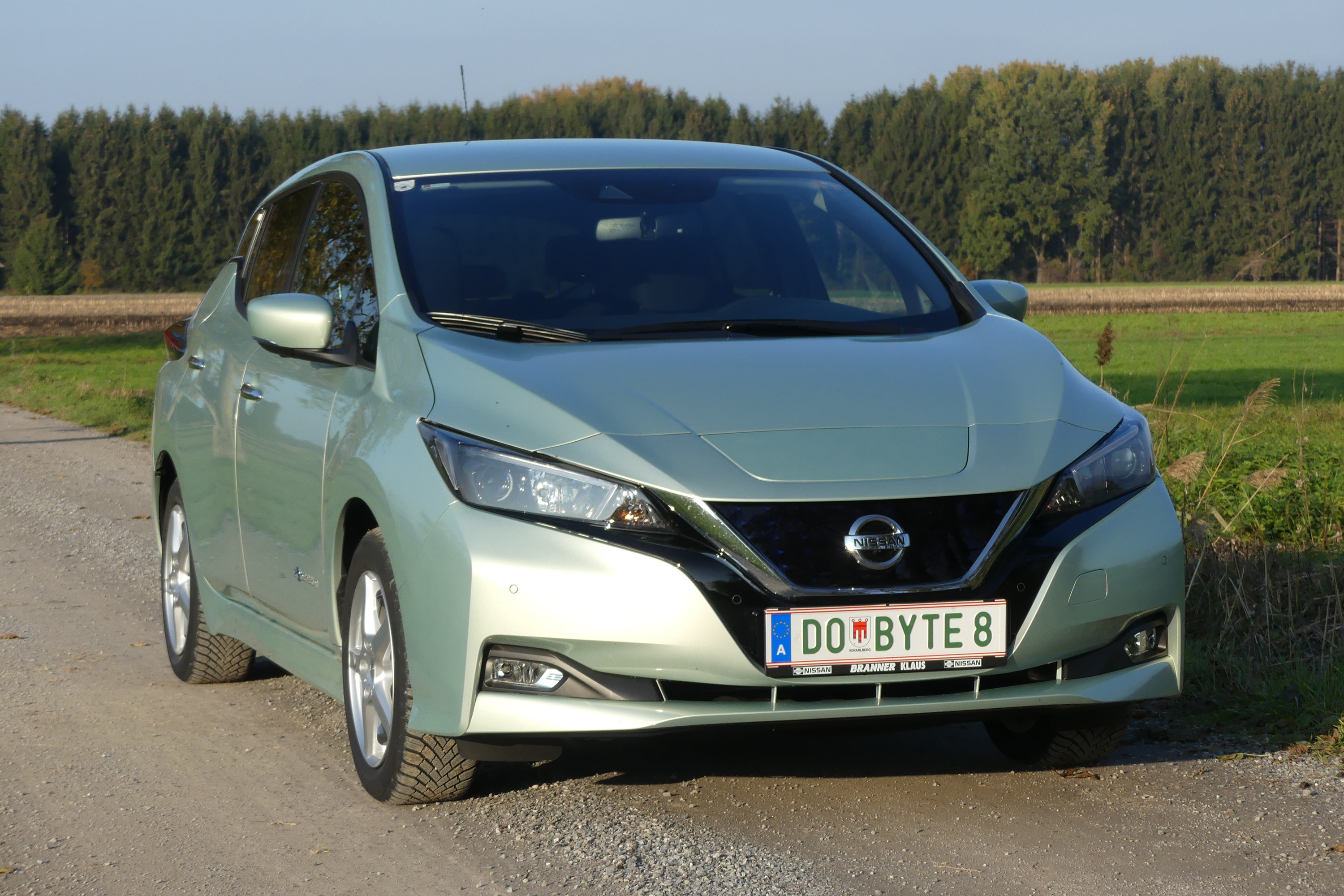
The Nissan Leaf is the Alliance's best selling electric car, with global sales of over 470,000 units by May 2020, and listed as the all-time top selling electric car until 2019.

Nissan leads global sales within the Alliance, with about 500,000 cars and vans sold by April 2020, followed by the Groupe Renault with more than 273,550 electric vehicles sold worldwide through December 2019. Mitsubishi's only all-electric vehicle is the i-MiEV, with global sales of over 50,000 units by March 2015, accounting for all variants of the i-MiEV, including the two Minicab MiEV versions sold in Japan.

The Alliance best selling Nissan Leaf was the world's top selling plug-in electric car in 2013 and 2014. Until 2019, the Nissan Leaf was the world's all-time top selling highway legal electric car with global sales of almost 450,000 units by the end of 2019. The Tesla Model 3 surpassed the Leaf in early 2020 to become the best selling electric car in history, with more than 500,000 sold by March 2020. The Zoe listed as the top selling all-electric car in Europe for two years running, 2015 and 2016. The Renault Kangoo Z.E. utility van is the European leader of the light-duty all-electric segment with global sales of 50,836 units through March 2020.

As of December 2019, Renault global sales were led by the Renault Zoe with 181,893 Zoe units, followed by the Kangoo Z.E. electric utility van with 48,821 units, the Twitzy heavy quadricycle with 29,118, and the Fluence Z.E. and its Korean variant, the Samsung SM3 Z.E., with 10,600 cars, all, since inception.

=== Mercedes-Benz strategic cooperation ===
The Alliance announced on 7 April 2010, a broad strategic co-operation with Daimler, reported to be worth €2 billion over five years. The companies are joined by an equity exchange that gives the Daimler a combined 3.1% in Renault and Nissan.

Immediately after the announcement, Renault and Daimler began working together on combined next-generation small cars: the Renault Twingo and Smart Fortwo, including electric versions as well as expanding both model ranges. The launches of the jointly developed small car models are scheduled to begin in 2013.

The smart plant in Hambach, France, will be the production location for two-seater versions, while the Renault plant in Novo Mesto in Slovenia will be the production location for the four-seater versions. Future models will also be available with an electric drive from launch. Powertrain sharing will focus on fuel-efficient, diesel and petrol engines. The Alliance will provide 3- and 4-cylinder petrol and diesel engines to Daimler.

The companies have agreed to share powertrain and development work on future projects across both passenger cars and light commercial vehicles. The deal will allow powertrain sharing between Infiniti and Mercedes-Benz vehicles and regional co-operation in the United States, China and Japan between Nissan, Infiniti and Daimler. Daimler will reportedly provide current 4- and 6-cylinder petrol and diesel engines to Infiniti.

In January 2012, the companies announced they would jointly produce engines in Nissan's plant in Decherd, Tennessee. The collaboration marks the first production of Mercedes-Benz engines in the North America Free Trade region. The Tennessee plant's strategic location and logistics links ensure a direct supply of engines starting in 2014 for the Mercedes-Benz C-Class, built at Daimler's vehicle plant in Tuscaloosa, Alabama. The deal marked the first time that Daimler had ever built engines in North America. The companies will together produce 250,000 four-cylinder gasoline engines in the plant.

In January 2013, Renault-Nissan, Daimler and a third partner, Ford Motor Co., announced three-way development on "affordable, mass-market" hydrogen fuel cell vehicles by 2017. The companies said they would invest equal amounts into the effort. By collaborating on the fuel cell stack and other system components, Ford, Daimler and Renault-Nissan hope to improve the technology and produce at a large scale. With a higher production volume, these automakers expect to generate economies of scale and offer more affordable cars.

In June 2014, the Alliance and Daimler announced they would jointly develop premium compact vehicles and jointly manufacture them in Aguascalientes, Mexico, where Nissan already has an existing manufacturing complex. The arrangement is a 50:50 joint venture and the new plant will have an annual capacity of 300,000 vehicles. The $1.36 billion venture will produce Infiniti models by 2017 and Mercedes-Benz compacts by the following year.

In 2021 each of the partners sold their shares in each other and ended the formal arrangement between the Alliance and Daimler.

=== United States ===
While Nissan is a major player in the United States and Mitsubishi also has a minor presence, Renault has not sold cars in the country since its sale of American Motors to Chrysler in 1987. Aside from Nissan's manufacturing base mostly centered in Tennessee, the Alliance operates a Silicon Valley Research Center in Sunnyvale, California, specializing in autonomous driving and connected cars. The office works with Silicon Valley–based technology companies and collaborates with Renault and Nissan technical centers in France and Japan. Areas of research include: autonomous vehicles; Internet-connected vehicles; and the area of human machine interface.

=== Brazil ===
In October 2011, the Renault–Nissan Alliance launched an $1.8 billion "Brazilian offensive" with two plants and a combined annual capacity of 580,000 vehicles per year.

Nissan invested 2.6 billion Brazilian reais (US$1.5 billion or €1.1 billion) to construct an all-new manufacturing facility and to develop, industrialize and launch new products in Resende, Rio de Janeiro. The all-new Nissan factory, which began production in the first half of 2014, have the capacity to produce up to 200,000 units annually and will create up to 2,000 jobs directly associated with the plant.

Renault invested an additional 500 million reais (US$285 million or €212 million) to expand an existing factory in São José dos Pinhais. The expanded plant will have an annual capacity of 380,000 vehicles per year starting in 2013. During the product cycle spanning 2010–2015, Renault invested an additional 1 billion Brazilian reais (US$571 million or €423 million) to cover the development, industrialization and launch of new vehicles for Brazilian consumers.

Purchasing for Renault and Nissan in Brazil operate through the common Renault–Nissan Purchasing Organization, which works closely with suppliers throughout Brazil to ensure that all parties maximize economies of scale. In addition to purchasing, the companies also work closely on supply chain management and manufacturing issues.

=== Russia ===
On 12 December 2012, the Renault–Nissan Alliance became the long-term controlling shareholder of AvtoVAZ, Russia's largest car company and owner of the country's biggest selling brand, Lada. According to the terms of the deal, Renault–Nissan is investing 23₽ billion (US$742 million) for 67.13% of the joint venture by mid-2014. As part of the deal, Renault–Nissan chairman and CEO Carlos Ghosn will become chairman of the board of the joint venture, called Alliance Rostec Auto BV. The Alliance's market share objective in Russia is to expand from 33 to 40% by 2015 with AvtoVAZ.

With AvtoVAZ, the Renault–Nissan Alliance builds Renault, Nissan and Lada models at its plant in Togliatti, which Russian Prime Minister Vladimir Putin inaugurated in April 2012. The assembly line has a maximum capacity of 350,000 cars per year. The Alliance also has plants in Moscow, St Petersburg and Izhevsk. With the Togliatti improvements and those planned at other manufacturing complexes, Renault–Nissan and AVTOVAZ will have a Russian capacity of at least 1.7 million cars per year starting in 2016. The investment in Russia began in February 2008, when Renault acquired a 25% share in AVTOVAZ.

On 18 September 2013, the Alliance and AvtoVAZ announced the creation of a joint part-purchasing company, "Common Purchasing Organization". It is equally owned by Alliance's RNPO and the Russian manufacturer.

=== India ===
In July 2013, Renault-Nissan CEO Carlos Ghosn confirmed the development of an all-new car platform in India to meet the demands of new car buyers in the fastest growing economies of the world. The platform, code named CMF-A (Common Module Family – Affordable), is being designed and engineered in India and it is the first all-new vehicle platform designed jointly from the ground up by both Renault and Nissan teams. The first cars on the platform will roll out in 2015.

The CMF-A cars will come from the Renault–Nissan Alliance plant and technical center in Chennai, which opened in 2010. The first vehicle to be produced was the Nissan Micra. Starting in 2011, the plant began building the Renault Koleos and Fluence. The factory is located in the Oragadam Expansion Scheme and represents an investment of about €800 million over seven years from February 2008 to 2015. The plant – which has full stamping, body, paint, plastic, trim and chassis shops with two test tracks – will have the capacity to produce 400,000 vehicles a year at full ramp up.

The plant can produce four separate platforms and eight body styles in random production order. Both sub-assembly and parts supply to the line are totally flexible. Efficiency is improved by having bumper and plastic moldings produced on site while the assembly line boasts a highly efficient logistics layout with a 100% kit supply system to the lineside which saves operators having to pick parts from more than one place reducing the need to walk to collect parts. This is a development of what Nissan does at its Oppama, Japan and Sunderland, UK facilities. The Renault team supports powertrain development, vehicle engineering, information systems, as well as styling and special project support for Renault's Mumbai-based design studio.

=== China ===
Nissan has a joint-venture company with China's Dongfeng Motor Company to produce and sell cars throughout China. In 2011, Nissan sold 1.24 million vehicles in China, making China Nissan's top market worldwide and making Nissan the top Asian automaker in China. Executives at Dongfeng said the reason they choose Nissan was because of the company's successful integration with strategic partner Renault, which allowed each entity to remain independent and brand-focused but gaining benefits of economies of scale.

Renault plans to enter the Chinese market with Dongfeng as well, signing a memorandum of understanding in April 2012. Renault anticipates a launch of vehicle production in China by 2016. The start of Renault production in China would complete the so-called "golden triangle" between Renault, Nissan and Dongfeng envisioned when parties signed the first agreement in 2000.

Directly through the Alliance, Renault entered world's largest automotive market in 2009, introducing the brand through imported cars including Laguna III, Koleos SUV and Scenic multi-purpose van. In February 2011, the Alliance inaugurated its China Warehouse in Shanghai, further establishing the partnership between Renault, Nissan and Dong Feng. The 8,000 square meter complex will provide a full range of auto parts, including 3,000 Renault and 10,000 Nissan parts covering almost all the imported models in China. It will also develop "best practices" for system optimization and shared technical platforms.

=== South Korea ===
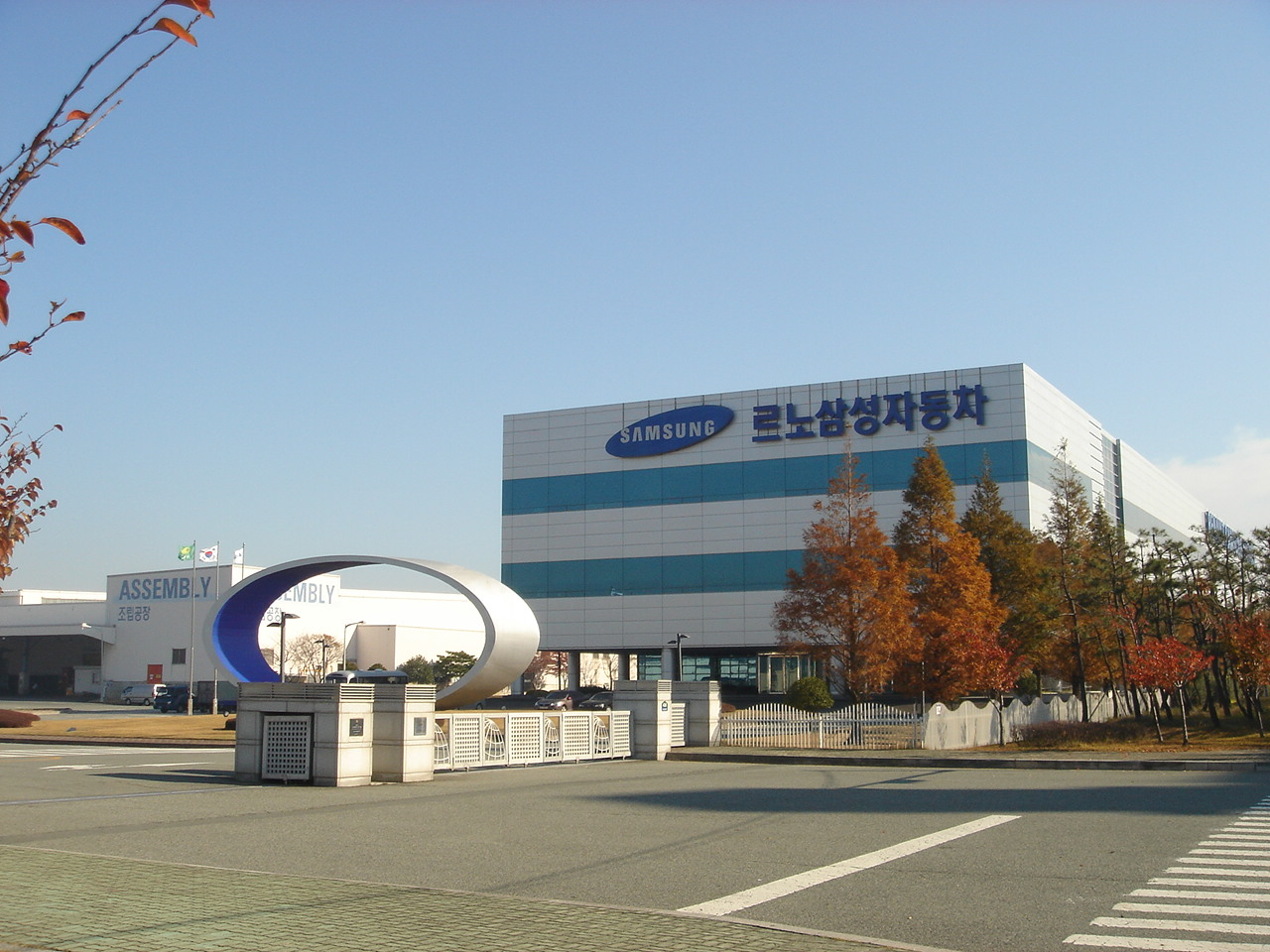
Renault Samsung Motors

In July 2012, the Renault–Nissan Alliance invested 170 billion won (US$ 160 million) in Renault Samsung Motors, the South Korean company that Renault purchased in 2000. The new investment added the capability to produce up to 80,000 Nissan Rogue crossover sport-utility vehicles per year at the Renault Samsung Motors plant in Busan, taking advantage of the free trade agreements of Korea with the United States and the European Union, as well as the favorable currency exchange. The Busan plant already produced the Renault Samsung SM3, SM5, SM6 and SM7 sedans, as well as the crossover QM5. Part of the production was exported to other markets, under the name Renault Koleos. Production of the Nissan Rogue began in September 2014.

=== Morocco ===
King Mohammed VI inaugurated the new Renault–Nissan Alliance plant in Tangier, Morocco, at a special ceremony attended by Carlos Ghosn, Chairman of Renault and Nissan. The new Renault–Nissan plant in Tangier represents an investment of €1 billion with annual production capacity of 400,000 vehicles with an estimated total staff of more than 6,000 by 2015.

In 2007, the Alliance announced a €600 million investment to build the Tangiers Industrial Project. Production of vehicles based on the Dacia Logan platform is to begin in 2012 with one production line and an initial annual output capacity of 170,000 vehicles. The Alliance has said capacity will increase to 400,000 vehicles a year, but has not given a timeline. The Tangiers development is one of the largest manufacturing complexes in the Mediterranean.
