= Katsutoshi Kawamura =

Japanese ice hockey player

Personal information
- Nationality: Japanese
- Born: 18 January 1954 (age 71); Hokkaido, Japan

Sport
- Sport: Ice hockey

Katsutoshi Kawamura (川村 克俊, Kawamura Katsutoshi, born 18 January 1954) is a Japanese ice hockey player. He competed in the men's tournament at the 1980 Winter Olympics.
