= NEC N343i =

Model of mobile phone

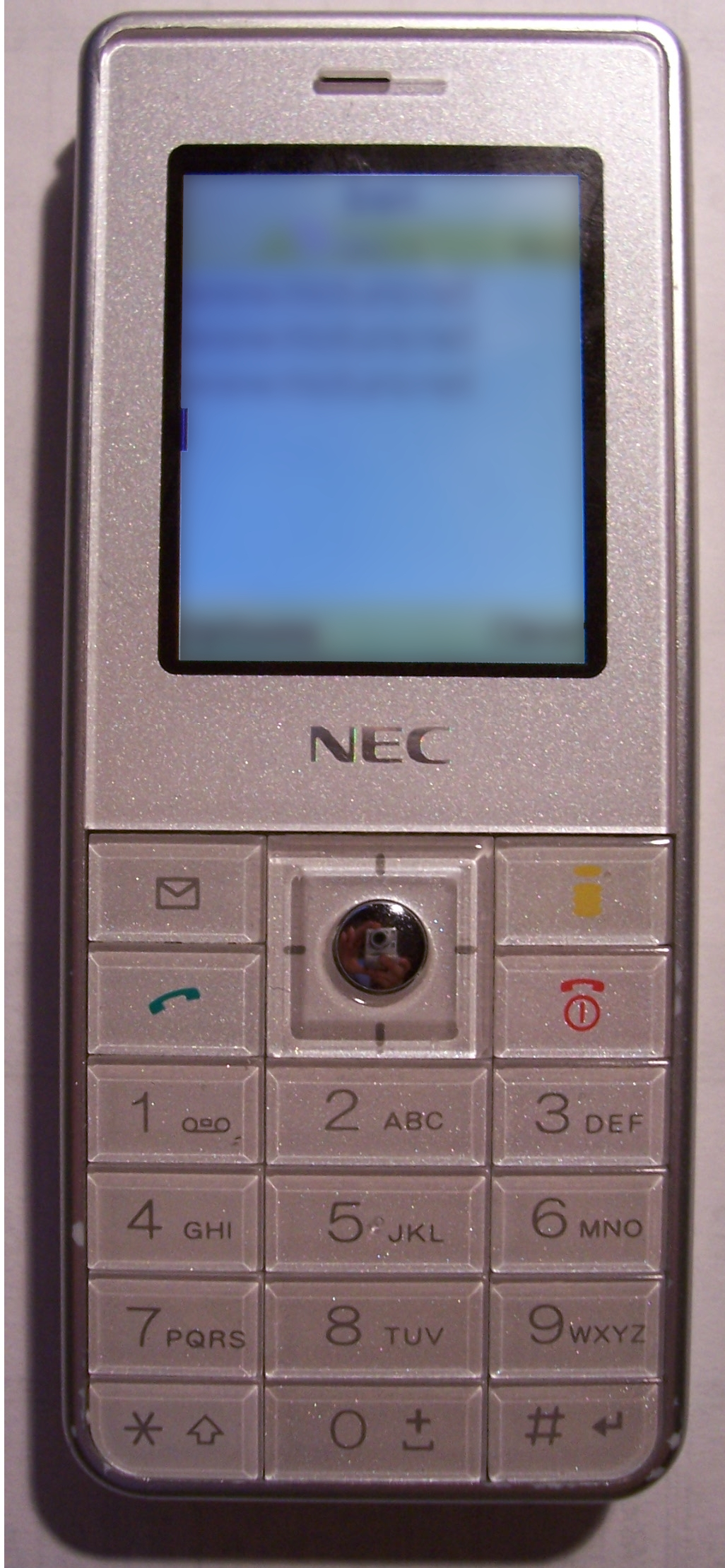
The NEC N343i

The NEC N343i is a GSM 900 – GSM 1800 – GSM 1900 mobile phone which was manufactured by NEC. Announced in quarter 2 of 2005, the phone was one of the smallest candy-bar models available in the UK at the time, at 109 × 43 × 12.7 mm and weighing 95 g.
