= Tsumori Chisato =

Japanese fashion designer

Tsumori Chisato (津森 千里; born 12 November 1954) is a Japanese fashion designer.

== Early life ==
Tsumori was born in Saitama, and attended Tokyo's Bunka Fashion College.

== Career ==
She began work with Issey Miyake in 1977 under the "Issey Sports" line, which was later renamed "I.S. Chisato Tsumori Designs." With the support of Miyake, she started her own line in 1990. She took her work to Paris in 2003, at the same time beginning her menswear line. Her aesthetic focuses on prints and has a "healthy dose of manga/bohemian cuteness".

In 1999 Tsumori opened her first free-standing shop outside of Asia. The boutique was designed by Christian Biecher and is located on rue Barbette in The Marais neighborhood of Paris.

Currently, the Tsumori Chisato brand has over 40 sales points along with Asian freestanding stores, and outlets in the United States, Italy, Russia, and Scandinavia.

== Aesthetic ==
Most of Tsumori's prints are painted by hand and draw inspiration from Japanese culture and manga, contemporary art, felines and various other sources. While most prints are hand painted, some prints are watercolor, drawn by pencil, or digital renderings. Although she lives in Paris, she pulls inspiration from her life in Japan.
