= Izumi Yamaguchi =

Japanese actress (born 1954)

- 山口 いづみ
- Born: 3 October 1954 (age 70); Shibuya, Tokyo, Japan
- Other names: Izumi Kosaka (小坂 泉, Kosaka Izumi; née Yamaguchi (山口))
- Citizenship: Japan
- Occupations: Actress; singer; artist
- Years active: 1972–
- Notable work: Erimo Misaki
- Television: Zakkyo Jidai; Ōedo Sōsamō; Edo o Kiru II
- Children: Kento Yamaguchi (eldest son)

Izumi Yamaguchi (山口 いづみ, Yamaguchi Izumi; born 3 October 1954, in Shibuya, Tokyo) is a Japanese actress. She is represented with F Road (Full House Group). Her son is actor Kento Yamaguchi.

== Biography ==
After dropping out from high school, she joined Watanabe Productions.

By the time she was in elementary school, she belonged to the theatre company "Kojika" (her first drama appearance is The Human Condition in the role of a Chinese child).

In 1972, she made her debut in the entertainment world with Zoku Ōoku no Onna-tachi. In April of that year, she debuted her musical career with "Midori no Kisetsu", but soon turned into an actress. She appeared on television dramas such as Zakkyo Jidai and Ōedo Sōsamō.

In 1982, she married a securities company employee. They gave birth to two boys.

On 1 September 2010, she moved to F Road from Office PSC that she belonged to.

Knowing the song "Četri stađuna" sung by Croatian national singer Meri Cetinić, she performed in live shows with her Croatian singing. Through videos published on the Internet, Croatia also gained popularity, and when she visited Croatia in 2011 she was welcomed.

== Filmography ==
=== Films ===
Year	Title	Role	Notes	Ref.
2015	A Sower of Seeds 2	General Manager Ogata		

=== TV dramas ===
Year	Title	Role	Notes	Ref.
1974–1976	Ōedo Sōsamō	Okon		
1975–2011	Mito Kōmon	Chie, Otayo, Shino and others		

=== Japanese dub ===
Date	Title	Role	Actor	Notes	Ref.
1974	Emmanuelle	Emmanuelle	Sylvia Kristel	1977 TV Asahi edition	

== Discography ==
=== Single records ===
Date	Title	Label	No.	Notes
5 Apr 1972	Midori no Kisetsu / Kaze no Fuku Machi	Toshiba	TP-2635	
25 Aug 1972	Midori no Taiyō / Jū-gatsu Umare	Toshiba	TP-2722	
20 Jan 1973	Chīsana Himitsu / Anata ga Nokoshite itta mono	Toshiba	TP-2797	
25 Jul 1973	Privacy / Koi no Inori	Toshiba	TP-2882	
Oct 1973	Soyokaze no yō ni			TV drama Zakkyo Jidai theme song (not released as a single, recorded in 1999 VAP "Comedy Drama Song Book")

=== Albums ===
Date	Title	Label	No.
2 Apr 2010	Izumi Yamaguchi Bossa nova o Utau	Think!	THCD131

== See also ==
- List of Japanese actresses
