= Kumiko (singer) =

Kumiko Takahashi (高橋 久美子, Takahashi Kumiko; born 1954), better known as Kumiko (クミコ), is a Japanese popular singer of chansons.

== Discography ==
Albums

- POKKOWA PA? (Pokkowa Pas 1987 Sound World)
- MACHI (1994 Eastern Gail)
- End of the century of the Waltz (1996 Toshiba EMI)
- AURA (2000 songs lyricist Takashi Matsumoto Toshiba EMI)
- Love Hymn (2002 avex io)
- When there is only love (2003 avex io)
- Icarus star - sing a Fubuki Koshiji (2004 avex io)
- I Aozora - 2004 Cocoon Live (2005 CD and DVD avex io)
- Kumiko Best - Our Uruwashiki love story (2006 avex io)
- Song Tachi of ten years and 1970s (2007 avex io)
- Complete Kumiko box - twenty-five years ~ (2007 CD8 sheets + DVD avex io)
- Kumiko meets Piaf (2007 avex io)
- My friend! ~ That starting Chi - Let's call the (journey) to "youth" (2008 avex io)
- Kumiko & Yoshio Inoue reach did not Ravureta Song Book (2010 avex io)
- Kumiko New Best "INORI~ prayer ~" (2011 avex io)
- ALONG THE Songs - has been walking with this song ~ (2012 avex io)
- Kumiko Chanson Best (2013 avex io)
- Beautiful era of song - Kumiko Columbia Covers (2014 Nippon Columbia)
