= Akihiro Maeta =

Japanese ceramic artist (born 1954)

- Born: 1 May 1954 (age 72); Tottori Prefecture, Japan
- Education: Osaka University of Arts
- Known for: Ceramic, porcelain

Akihiro Maeta (前田 昭博, Maeta Akihiro) (from Tottori, Japan, born May 1, 1954) is a Japanese ceramic artist known for white porcelain. He is a Living National Treasure of Japan and a member of the Japan Kōgei Association.

Maeta's style is achieved by hand-forming his works as opposed to forming them on a potter's wheel. He uses his fingers, palms, and a blade to perfect the shape of his white porcelain sculptures.

== Awards and recognition ==
As a result of his work with ceramics, Maeta has won numerous awards including the Ceramic Society of Japan award in 2003. He is also acknowledged as a holder of important intangible cultural property for his work with white porcelain.

In 2007, he was awarded a Medal of Honour with purple ribbon by the government of Japan.

In 2013, he was recognized as a Living National Treasure of Japan.

== Collections containing work ==
- British Museum, London, United Kingdom
- Tottori Prefectural Museum, Tottori Prefecture, Japan
