= Osamu Masuko =

Japanese business executive (1949–2020)

- Born: February 19, 1949; Tokyo, Japan
- Died: August 27, 2020 (aged 71)
- Occupation: Businessperson

Osamu Masuko (益子 修, Masuko Osamu, February 19, 1949 – August 27, 2020) was a Japanese business executive. He was an executive of Mitsubishi Motors, serving as president from 2005 to 2020, CEO from 2005 to 2014 and 2016 to 2019, as well as chairman from 2018 to 2020.

== Biography ==
Masuko was born in Tokyo. He joined Mitsubishi Corporation in 1972 after working at Kaijo High School and Waseda University Faculty of Political Science and Economics, Department of Economics. He worked in the automobile field at the company, and was proficient in expanding trade areas such as South Korea and Indonesia. In 2003, he became an executive officer of the company and general manager of Mitsubishi Motors.

In 2004, Masuko was entrusted with the reconstruction of Mitsubishi Motors, which was in serious financial crisis due to the discovery of a large-scale hidden recall, transferred to the company, and became the managing director (overseas business manager) with the right of representation. In January 2005, he became the president of the company. Masuko became chairman in June 2014 and concurrently served as the newly established CEO. In 2016, the problem of fuel economy fraud in light vehicles was discovered, and on June 24, the same year, when President Tetsuro Aikawa retired, he returned to the presidency and became chairman, president and CEO. In October of the same year, Nissan became the largest shareholder of Mitsubishi Motors, and Carlos Ghosn became chairman. Masuko had announced his resignation, but Ghosn's detention led him to continue as president and CEO. At the general meeting of shareholders in June 2017, Masuko announced that he would only hold the title of CEO. At the June 2019 shareholders' meeting, he retired as CEO and would only be chairman.

On August 7, 2020, he retired as chairman of the board for health reasons and became a special adviser, but died of heart failure on August 27, at 71 years old.
