= Tomoyo Nonaka =

Japanese businesswoman (born 1954)

Tomoyo Nonaka (野中 ともよ, Nonaka Tomoyo; born June 18, 1954) is a television personality and businesswoman from Japan. She was the CEO of Sanyo Electric from 2005 to 2007.

== Television career ==
Beginning in 1979, Nonaka was a newscaster and anchorwoman for NHK, the national TV station in Japan. Her main programs at NHK included Weekly Abroad、Sports and News、Sunday Sports Special and others. From 1993 to 1997, she was the anchorwoman for the popular business program World Business Satellite at TV Tokyo. In addition to activities as a journalist, she has been member for many Japanese government committees for Cabinet Office, Ministry of Finance, Ministry of Education and Ministry of Economy, Trade and Industry.

Furthermore, she has been adviser and a member of the board of directors for many large Japanese corporations such as Asahi Breweries, Sumitomo Corporation, NTT Docomo, Nikko Citigroup, and Unisys, Japan.

== Sanyo Electric ==
In 2002, she became an outside director of the board for Sanyo Electric. In 2005, she became chairperson and CEO for Sanyo Electric, with no experience in electronics or senior management; she had spent her entire career until that point as a popular broadcast journalist. Upon her taking chairperson position, she created the new corporation vision 'Think Gaia' and started to restructure many business divisions under the new vision for Sanyo to become a leading company to solve environmental problems with its technology. She created a three-year Evolution Plan aimed at reorganizing the business portfolio and improving the corporate financial structure and conditions.

In a short time, Sanyo introduced more than ten new Think Gaia (TG) products, and the following four "world-first" products:

1. Eneloop batteries: rechargeable batteries that can be recharged up to a thousand times.
2. Aqua: a washing machine and dryer that reduces water usage in a wash-cycle from 200 liters to 8 liters by purifying the used water and making air-washing possible through ozone technology.
3. Enegreen: an innovative way to reduce electricity consumption in air-conditioners, refrigerators, and food show-cases in stores and supermarkets. Enegreen absorbs as much CO_{2} as a forest with an area 130-times larger than the store.
4. Virus-Washer: an air-cleaner that eliminates up to 99 percent of airborne viruses, including avian influenza (bird flu) virus, using a technology that electrolyzes simple tap water.

Sanyo underwent drastic restructuring in the first two years and under the three-year Evolution Plan raised the bottom line from red to black, with an operating income of about 750 million dollars and a net profit of around 280 million for the fiscal year ending March 2008.

However, under her two years' chairpersonship, Ms. Nonaka constantly fought about how to run the company with board members sent by the main investors insisted that the corporate vision "Think Gaia" was too "naive" and "feminine" to produce the desired profit. It was apparent that the main investors' interest was to make a capital gains by selling their shares not to run manufacturing business.

The conflict with the main investors owing the majority of the board led to her resignation as Chairperson of Sanyo in March 2007.

'Think Gaia' vision was also created to shift Sanyo business portfolio in order to make Sanyo profitable by not only to focus on Sanyo's business strength (the most profitable business in the field of solar business and rechargeable batteries, eneloop and hi-brid automobile batteries, as well as the world best technological strength) but also to restructure business unmatched to the 'Think Gaia' vision and money losing business (primarily home electronics business). Nonaka's vision and intention were never understood by many critics and more so by the main investors at that time.

In November 2008, Panasonic announced to buy Sanyo in order to acquire Sanyo's green business, solar and rechargeable batteries.

== Current social activities ==
"The Gaia Initiative", a not-for-profit organization was established in 2007 to call not only one corporation, Sanyo, but also wider stakeholders (corporations, citizen, government and NGO/NPO) for solving environmental problems in the world, GAIA.

In May 2008, NPO Gaia initiative of Nonaka agreed to collaborate with The Energy and Resources Institute (TERI) in India with Dr.Rajendra Pachauri, chairman of IPCC and the 2007 Nobel Peace Prize winner.

She also work closely with Dr.Ervin Laszlo, the head of The Club of Budapest, and contributed her writing to his recent book 'Worldshif Notebook'. Laszlo is a systems philosopher, integral theorist, and classical pianist. Twice nominated for the Nobel Peace Prize, he has authored more than 70 books. She initiated Worldshift Network Japan and is leading the 'Worldshift' movement in Japan.

She is also the executive member of 'Club of Rome'

She graduated from Sophia University with a major in Journalism, and went on to study photo journalism at the University of Missouri, Columbia in the United States.
