= Mari Matsunaga =

Editor in Japan

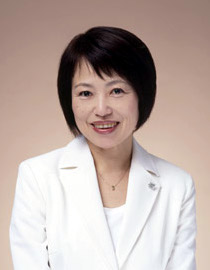
- Portrait released upon inauguration as a member of the "Building a Beautiful Country" Planning Committee
- Native name: 松永真理
- Born: 13 November 1954 (age 71) Sasebo City, Nagasaki Prefecture
- Occupation: Editor, author, businesswoman

Mari Matsunaga (born 13 November 1954) is a Japanese editor, author, and businesswoman. She is also the representative of the Matsunaga Mari Office.

After working at Japan Recruit Center Co., Ltd. and Recruit Co., Ltd., she served as head of the planning office in the Gateway Business Division at NTT Mobile Communications Network Corporation.

== Biography ==
=== Early life ===
Matsunaga was born in Sasebo, Nagasaki Prefecture. Her grandfather was Vice Admiral Matsunaga Sadaichi, and her father was Navy Captain and author Matsunaga Ichiro. He graduated from Nagasaki Prefectural Sasebo Kita High School and Meiji University's Department of French Literature.

=== As an editor ===
In 1977, she joined Japan Recruit Center (now Recruit). After working in the editorial departments of magazines such as "Torabayu" and "Recruit Book", she became editor-in-chief of "Shuushoku Journal" in July 1986, and editor-in-chief of "Torabayu" in July 1988. In July 1997, she left the company to join NTT Mobile Communications Network (now NTT DoCoMo). She became head of the planning office in the Gateway Business Department at NTT Mobile Communications Network, where she was involved in the planning and development of i-mode. She left the company in March 2000 and established the Matsunaga Mari Office.

== Recognition ==
- She coined the term "i-mode"
- In the October 2000 issue of Fortune magazine, she was ranked number one in the Asian category of "The Most Powerful Women in Business"
- She was named "Woman of the Year 2000" by Nikkei Woman magazine

== Bibliography ==
- 『なぜ仕事するの？』 講談社 1994年 ISBN 4-06-207076-6
- 『iモード事件』 角川書店 2000年 ISBN 4-04-883633-1
- 『iモード以前』 岩波書店 2002年 ISBN 4-00-022009-8
- 『シゴトのココロ』 小学館 2004年 ISBN 4-09-387494-8
- 監修『しごとっち－バンダイ的スター誕生！－』 幻冬舎メディアコンサルティング 2005年 ISBN 4-344-99500-7

== See also ==
- Takeshi Natsuno
- Iwao Aso
