= TI-Nspire series =

Series of graphing calculators

TI-Nspire with Clickpad
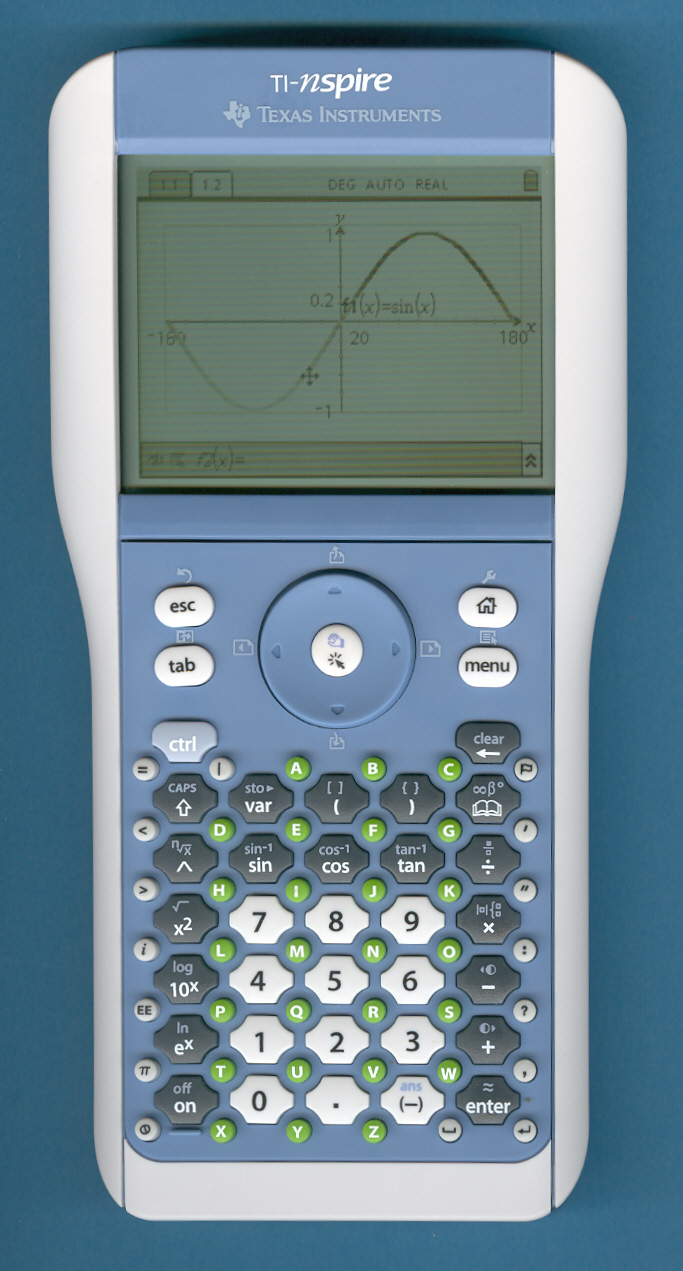
- Type: Programmable, Graphing
- Manufacturer: Texas Instruments
- Introduced: 25 September 2007
- Discontinued: 2010
- Latest firmware: 3.9.0.463
- Predecessor: TI-84 Plus; TI-84 Plus Silver Edition

Calculator
- Entry mode: DAL, MathPrint
- Precision: 14
- Display type: LCD Dot-matrix
- Display size: 320×240 (3.5" diagonal)

Programming
- Programming language(s): TI-Nspire BASIC, Lua
- User memory: 32 MB NAND Memory (20 MB user-accessible); 32 MB SDRAM (16 MB user-accessible)
- Firmware memory: 512 KB NOR ROM

Other
- Power supply: 4 AAAs
- Weight: 252 grams (8.9 ounces)
- Dimensions: 201 mm × 99 mm × 22 mm (7.9 in × 3.9 in × 0.85 in)

TI-Nspire CAS with Clickpad
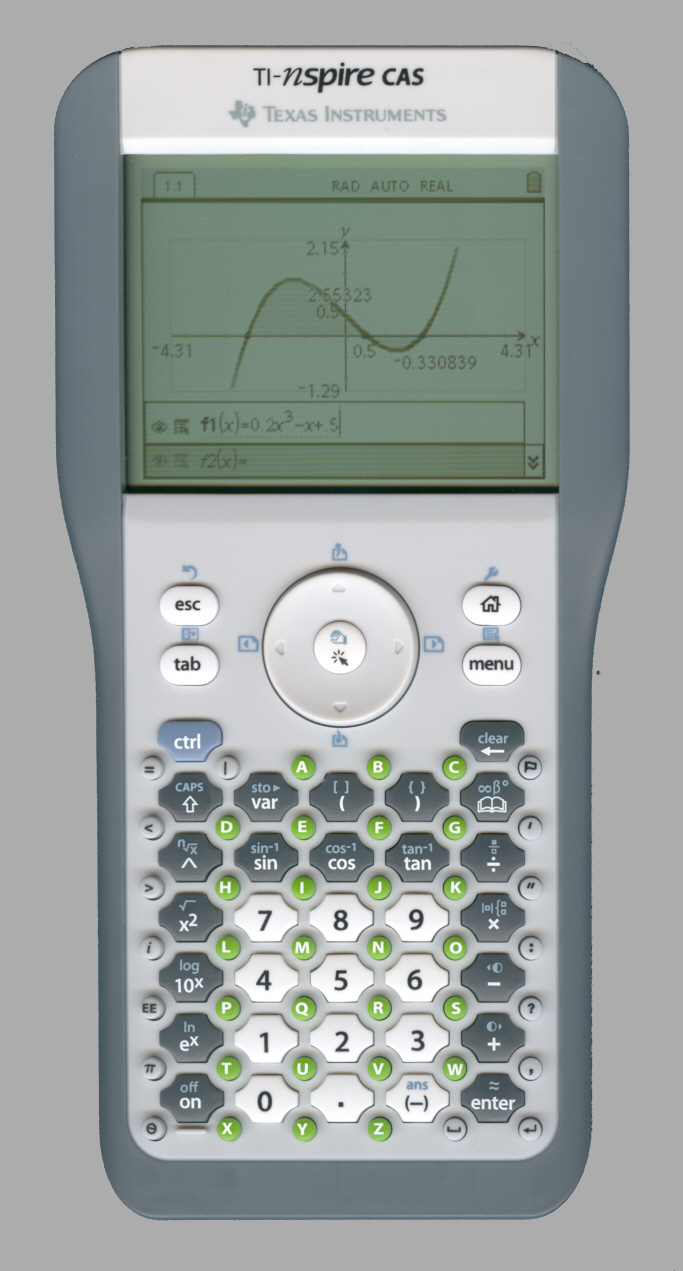
- Type: Programmable, Graphing, Symbolic
- Manufacturer: Texas Instruments
- Introduced: 2007
- Discontinued: 2010
- Latest firmware: 3.9.0.463
- Predecessor: TI-89 Titanium; Voyage 200
- Successor: TI-Nspire CAS with Touchpad

Calculator
- Entry mode: DAL, MathPrint
- Precision: 14
- Display type: LCD Dot-matrix
- Display size: 320×240 (3.5" diagonal)

Programming
- Programming language(s): TI-Nspire BASIC, Lua
- User memory: 32 MB NAND Memory (20 MB user-accessible); 32 MB SDRAM (16 MB user-accessible)
- Firmware memory: 512 KB NOR ROM

Other
- Power supply: 4 AAAs
- Weight: 252 grams (8.9 ounces)
- Dimensions: 201 mm × 99 mm × 22 mm (7.9 in × 3.9 in × 0.85 in)

TI-Nspire with Touchpad
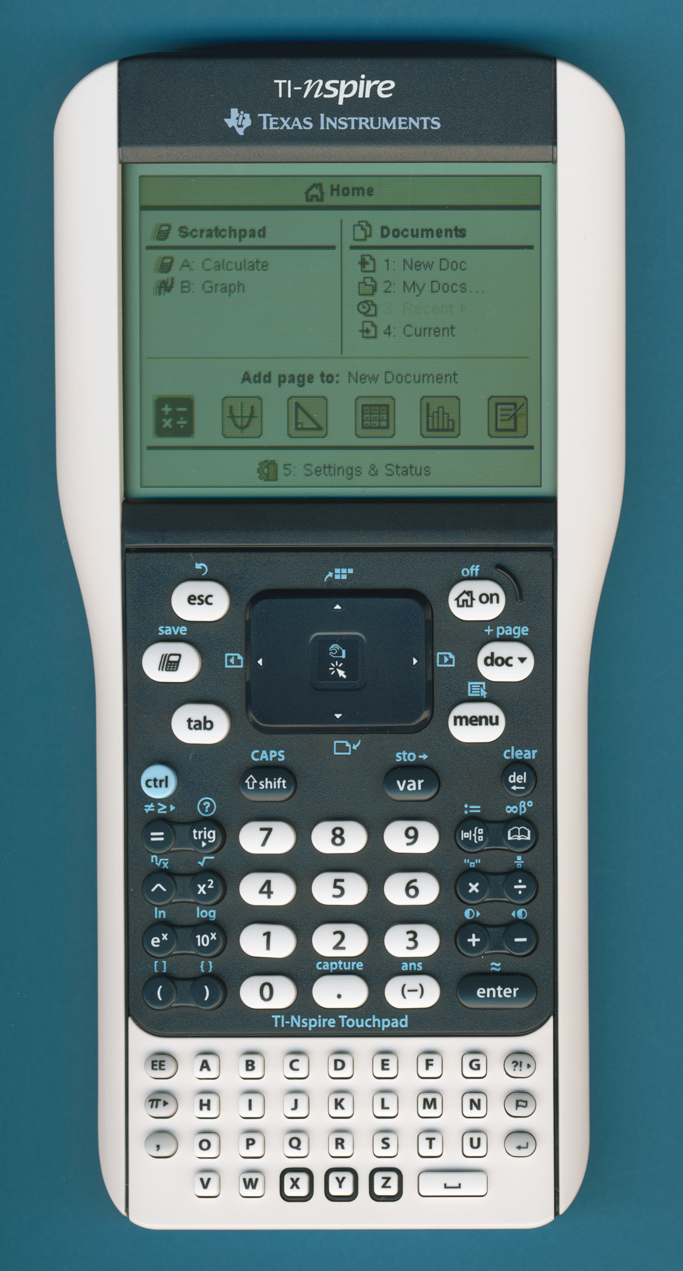
- Type: Programmable, Graphing
- Manufacturer: Texas Instruments
- Introduced: 2010
- Latest firmware: 3.9.0.463
- Predecessor: TI-Nspire with Clickpad
- Successor: TI-Nspire CX

Calculator
- Entry mode: DAL, MathPrint
- Precision: 14
- Display type: LCD Dot-matrix
- Display size: 320×240 (3.5" diagonal)

Programming
- Programming language(s): TI-Nspire BASIC, Lua
- User memory: 32 MB NAND Memory (20 MB user-accessible); 32 MB SDRAM (16 MB user-accessible)
- Firmware memory: 512 KB NOR ROM

Other
- Power supply: 4 AAAs or Li-Ion battery pack
- Weight: 280 grams (9.9 ounces)
- Dimensions: 198 mm × 99 mm × 22 mm (7.8 in × 3.9 in × 0.85 in)

TI-Nspire CAS with Touchpad
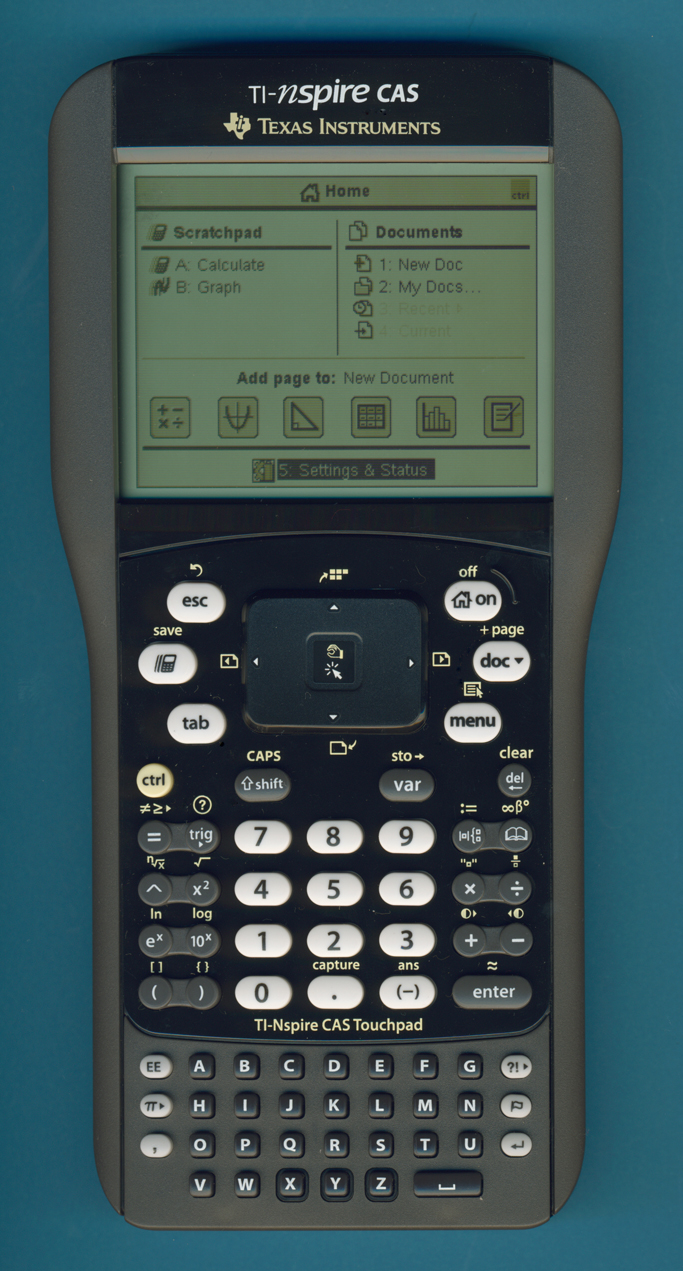
- Type: Programmable, Graphing, Symbolic
- Manufacturer: Texas Instruments
- Introduced: 2010
- Latest firmware: 3.9.0.463
- Predecessor: TI-Nspire CAS with Clickpad
- Successor: TI-Nspire CX CAS

Calculator
- Entry mode: DAL, MathPrint
- Precision: 14
- Display type: LCD Dot-matrix
- Display size: 320×240 (3.5" diagonal)

Programming
- Programming language(s): TI-Nspire BASIC, Lua
- User memory: 32 MB NAND Memory (20 MB user-accessible); 32 MB SDRAM (16 MB user-accessible)
- Firmware memory: 512 KB NOR ROM

Other
- Power supply: 4 AAAs or Li-Ion battery pack
- Weight: 280 grams (9.9 ounces)
- Dimensions: 198 mm × 99 mm × 22 mm (7.8 in × 3.9 in × 0.85 in)

TI-Nspire CX
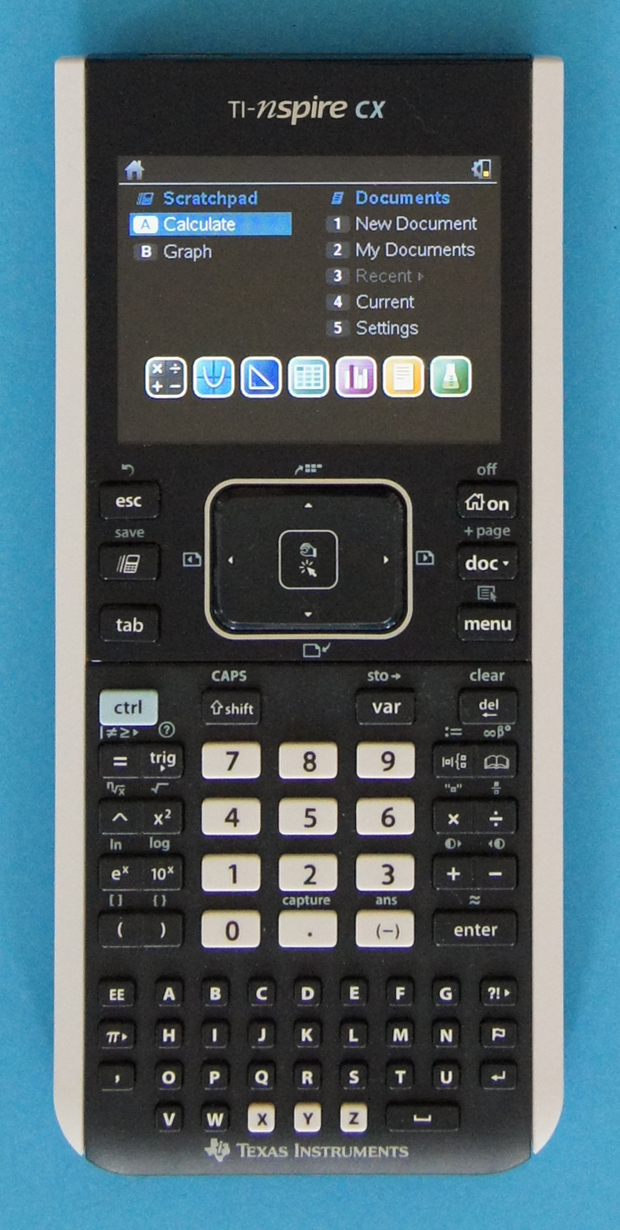
- Type: Programmable, Graphing
- Manufacturer: Texas Instruments
- Introduced: 25 February 2011
- Latest firmware: 4.5.5.79
- Predecessor: TI-Nspire with Touchpad

Calculator
- Entry mode: DAL, MathPrint
- Precision: 14
- Display type: Color LCD
- Display size: 320×240 (3.2" diagonal)

Programming
- Programming language(s): TI-Nspire BASIC, Lua
- User memory: 128 MB NAND Memory (100 MB user-accessible); 64 MB SDRAM (64 MB user-accessible)
- Firmware memory: 512 KB NOR ROM

Other
- Power supply: 3.7L1230SP Li-Ion
- Weight: 242 grams (8.5 oz)
- Dimensions: 191 mm × 86 mm × 15 mm (7.5 in × 3.4 in × 0.60 in)

TI-Nspire CX CAS
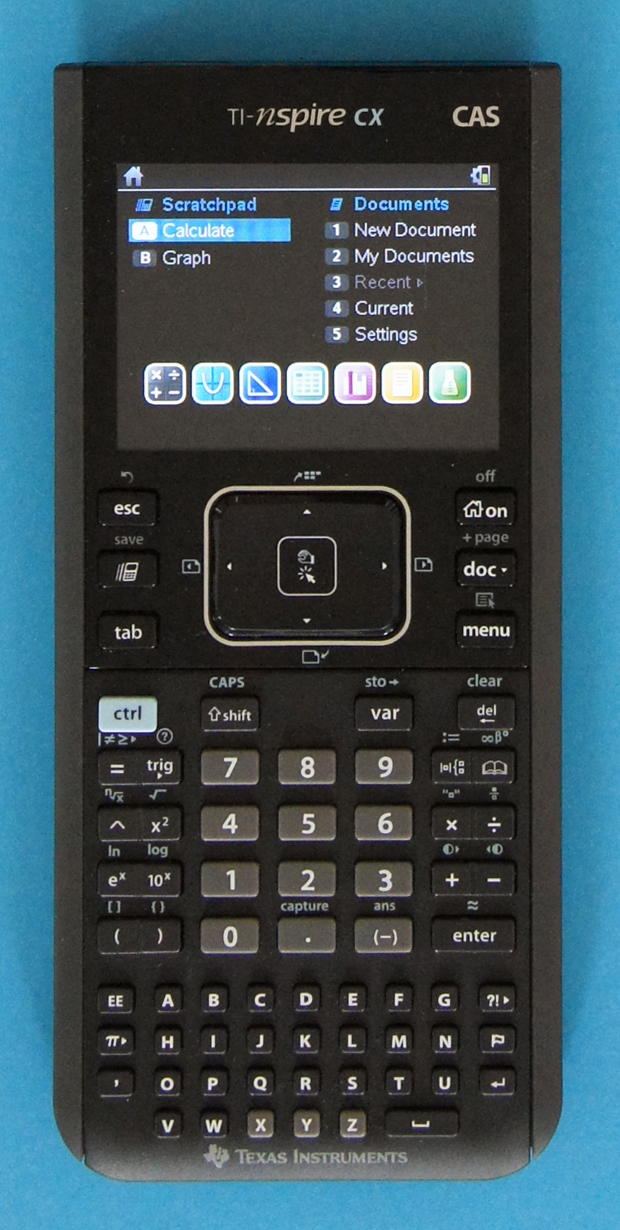
- Type: Programmable, Graphing, Symbolic
- Manufacturer: Texas Instruments
- Introduced: 25 February 2011
- Latest firmware: 4.5.5.79
- Predecessor: TI-Nspire CAS with Touchpad

Calculator
- Entry mode: DAL, MathPrint
- Precision: 14
- Display type: Color LCD
- Display size: 320×240 (3.2" diagonal)

Programming
- Programming language(s): TI-Nspire BASIC, Lua
- User memory: 128 MB NAND Memory (100 MB user-accessible); 64 MB SDRAM (64 MB user-accessible)
- Firmware memory: 512 KB NOR ROM

Other
- Power supply: 3.7L1230SP Li-Ion
- Weight: 242 grams (8.5 oz)
- Dimensions: 191 mm × 86 mm × 15 mm (7.5 in × 3.4 in × 0.60 in)

TI-Nspire CX II
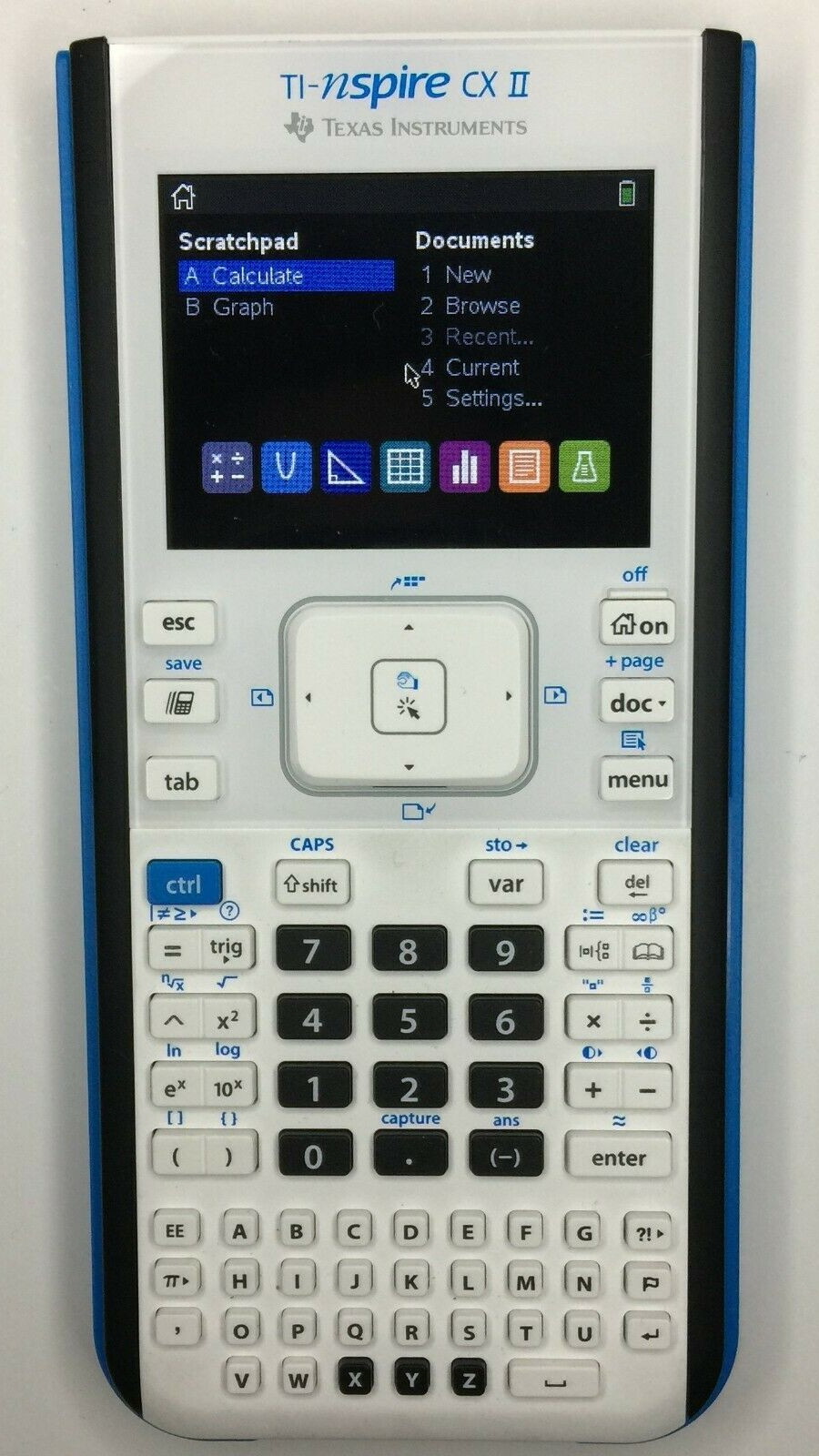
- Type: Programmable, Graphing
- Manufacturer: Texas Instruments
- Introduced: March 2019
- Latest firmware: 6.4.0
- Predecessor: TI-Nspire CX

Calculator
- Entry mode: DAL, MathPrint
- Precision: 14
- Display type: Color LCD
- Display size: 320×240 (3.22 diagonal)

Programming
- Programming language(s): TI-Nspire BASIC, Lua, Python
- User memory: 128 MB NAND Memory (90+ MB user-accessible); 64 MB SDRAM (64 MB user-accessible)
- Firmware memory: 512 KB NOR ROM

Other
- Power supply: 3.7L1230SP Li-Ion
- Weight: 242 grams (8.5 oz)
- Dimensions: 191 mm × 86 mm × 15 mm (7.5 in × 3.4 in × 0.60 in)

TI-Nspire CX II CAS
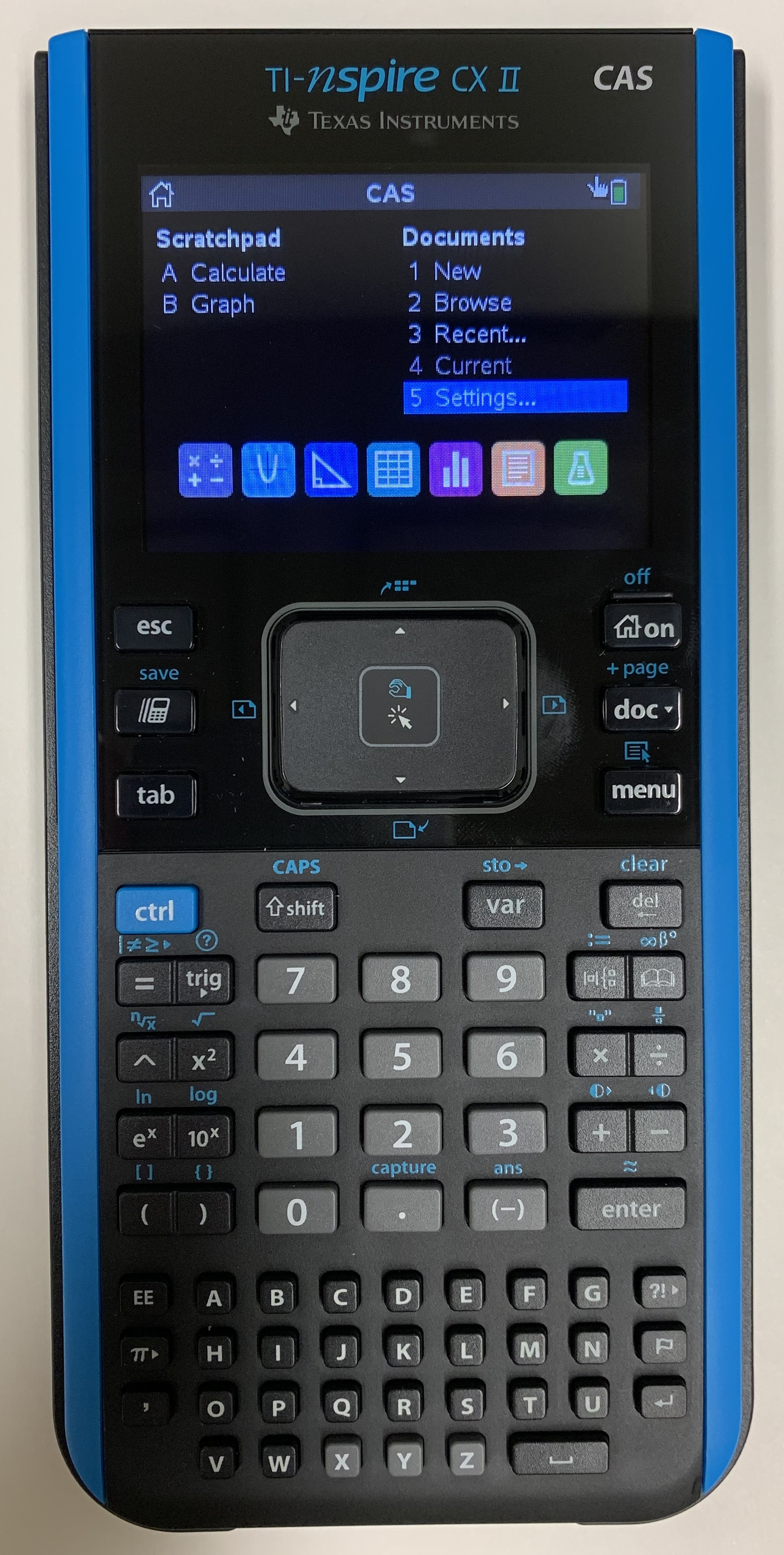
- Type: Programmable, Graphing, Symbolic
- Manufacturer: Texas Instruments
- Introduced: March 2019
- Latest firmware: 6.4.0
- Predecessor: TI-Nspire CX CAS

Calculator
- Entry mode: DAL, MathPrint
- Precision: 14
- Display type: Color LCD
- Display size: 320×240 (3.2" diagonal)

Programming
- Programming language(s): TI-Nspire BASIC, Lua, Python
- User memory: 128 MB NAND Memory (90+ MB user-accessible); 64 MB SDRAM (64 MB user-accessible)
- Firmware memory: 512 KB NOR ROM

Other
- Power supply: 3.7L1230SP Li-Ion
- Weight: 242 grams (8.5 oz)
- Dimensions: 191 mm × 86 mm × 15 mm (7.5 in × 3.4 in × 0.60 in)

The TI-Nspire is a graphing calculator line made by Texas Instruments, with the first version released on 25 September 2007. The calculators feature a non-QWERTY keyboard and a different key-by-key layout than Texas Instruments's previous flagship calculators such as the TI-89 series.

== Development ==
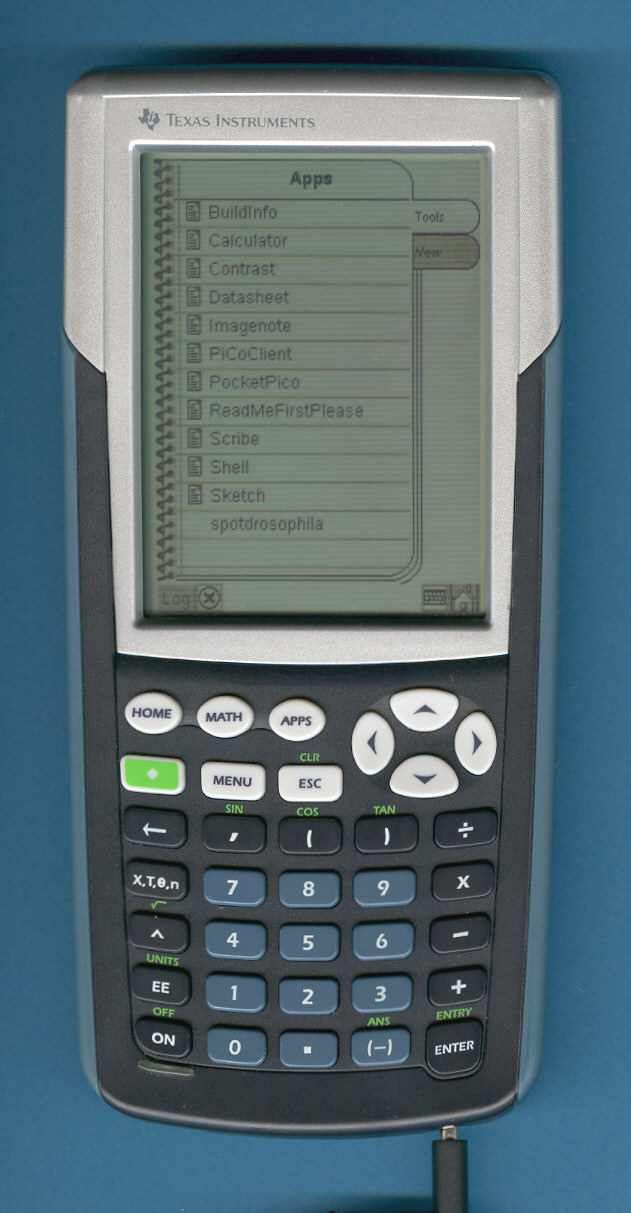
TI PLT SHH1

The original TI-Nspire was developed out of the TI PLT SHH1 prototype model, the TI-92 series of calculators released in 1995, and the TI-89 series of calculators released in 1998.

In 2011, Texas Instruments released the CX line of their TI-Nspire calculators which effectively replaced the previous generation. The updates included improvements to the original's keyboard layout, an addition of a rechargeable lithium-ion battery, 3D graphing capabilities and reduced form factor. TI got rid of the removable keypad with this generation and therefore, the TI-84 compatibility mode.

In 2019, the TI-Nspire CX II was added, with a boost in clock speed and changes to the existing operating system.

== Versions ==
The TI-Nspire series uses a different operating system compared to Texas Instruments' other calculators. The TI-Nspire includes a file manager that lets users create and edit documents. As a result of being developed from PDA-esque devices, the TI-Nspire retains many of the same functional similarities to a computer.

=== TI-Nspire ===
The standard TI-Nspire calculator is comparable to the TI-84 Plus in features and functionality. It features a TI-84 mode by way of a replaceable snap-in keypad and contains a TI-84 Plus emulator. The likely target of this is secondary schools that make use of the TI-84 Plus currently or have textbooks that cover the TI-83 (Plus) and TI-84 Plus lines, and to allow them to transition to the TI-Nspire line more easily.

The TI 84 Plus keypad for the TI Nspire.

The TI-Nspire started development in 2004. It uses a proprietary SoC of the ARM9 variant for its CPU. The TI-Nspire and TI-Nspire CAS (Computer algebra system) calculators have 32 MB of NAND Flash, 32 MB of SDRAM, and 512 KB of NOR Flash. However, only 20 MB and 16 MB are user-accessible respectively.

The TI-Nspire released in two models; a numeric and CAS version. The numeric is similar in features to the TI-84, except with a bigger and higher resolution screen and a full keyboard. The feature that the numeric lacks is the ability to solve algebraic equations such as indefinite integrals and derivatives. To fill in the gap of needing an algebraic calculator, Texas Instruments introduced the second model with the name TI-Nspire CAS. The CAS is designed for college and university students, giving them the feature of calculating many algebraic equations like the Voyage 200 and TI-89 (which the TI-Nspire was intended to replace). However, the TI-Nspire does lack part of the ability of programming and installing additional apps that the previous models had, although a limited version of TI-BASIC is supported, along with Lua in later versions. C and assembly are only possible by Ndless.

Because the TI-Nspire lacks a QWERTY keyboard, it is acceptable for use on the PSAT, SAT, SAT II, ACT, AP, and IB Exams.

=== TI-Nspire CAS ===
The TI-Nspire CAS calculator is capable of displaying and evaluating values symbolically, not just as floating-point numbers. It includes algebraic functions such as a symbolic differential equation solver: deSolve(...), the complex eigenvectors of a matrix: eigVc(...), as well as calculus based functions, including limits, derivatives, and integrals. For this reason, the TI-Nspire CAS is more comparable to the TI-89 Titanium and Voyage 200 than to other calculators. Unlike the TI-Nspire, it is not compatible with the snap-in TI-84 Plus keypad. It is accepted in the SAT and AP exams (without a QWERTY keyboard) but not in the ACT, IB or British GCSE and A level. The body color is grey.

=== TI-Nspire Touchpad and TI-Nspire CAS Touchpad ===
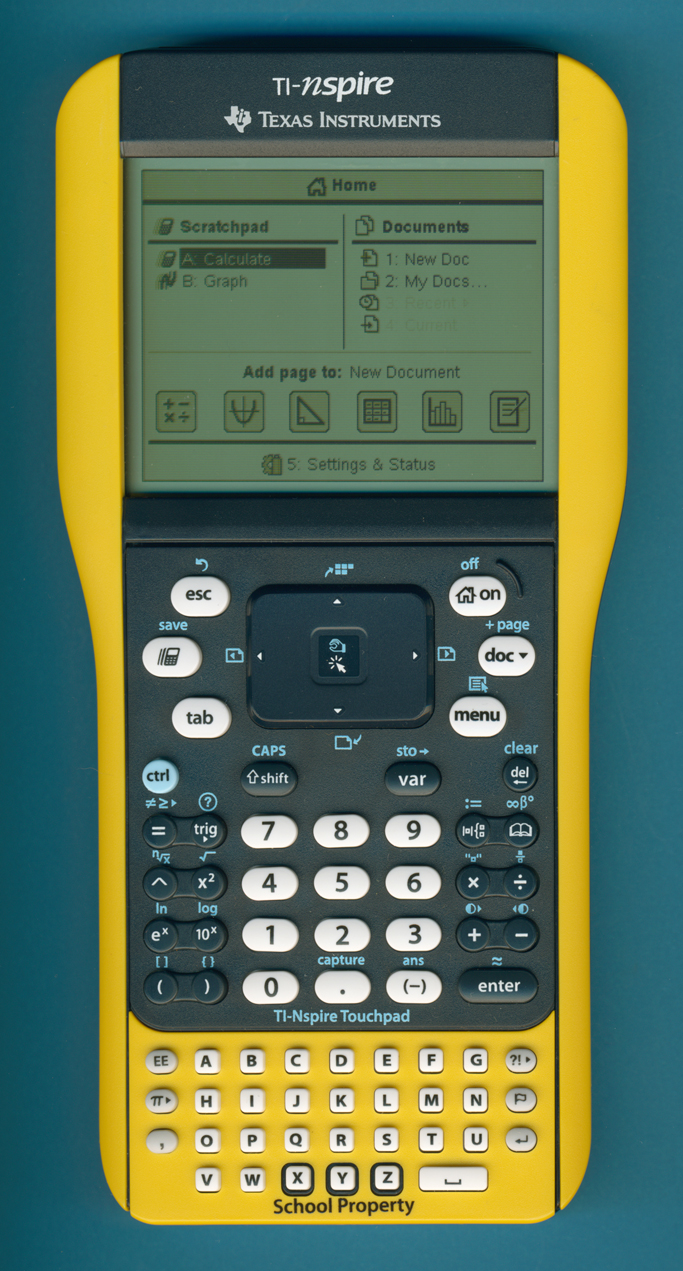
TI-Nspire EZ-Spot. Meant to reduce theft in schools.

On 8 March 2010, Texas Instruments announced new models of the TI-Nspire Touchpad and TI-Nspire CAS Touchpad graphing calculators. In the United States, the new calculator was listed on the TI website as a complement to the TI-Nspire with Clickpad, though it was introduced as a successor to the previous model in other countries. The calculators were released alongside the OS 2.0 update, which featured a number of updates to the user interface and new functions.

The keyboards on the touchpad keypads featured a different and less crowded key layout along with the touchpad, which is used for navigation. The touchpad keypads were also compatible with older calculators that are running OS 2.0 or newer. New calculators that were shipped with touchpad keypads supported an optional rechargeable battery. The second generation was available in two models, the TI-Nspire Touchpad and TI-Nspire CAS Touchpad; each model has maintained the color of itself, with the base model being white and black while the CAS is black and gray.

While the keyboards of the Nspire Touchpad and the Nspire CAS Touchpad are both removable (to access the AAA batteries), only the Nspire Touchpad is compatible with the TI-84 Plus Keypad that invokes the TI-84 Plus emulator. The Nspire CAS Touchpad keyboard has a slightly rounded top which makes it incompatible with the emulator keypad.

To reduce theft of school-owned TI-Nspire calculators, Texas Instruments also introduced the EZ-Spot Teacher Packs with a bright, easy-to-spot, "school bus yellow" frame and slide case. The hardware of both versions are the same, with the only differences being cosmetic. The TI-Nspire calculators that were released after the touchpad TI-Nspires also have EZ-Spot versions.

=== TI-Nspire CX and TI-Nspire CX CAS ===
In 2011, the TI-Nspire CX and CX CAS were announced as updates to TI-Nspire series. They have a thinner design, with a thickness of 1.57 cm (almost half of the TI-89), a 1,200 mA·h (1,060 mAh before 2013) rechargeable battery (wall adapter is included in the American retail package), a 320 by 240 pixel full color backlit display (3.2" diagonal), and OS 3.0 which includes features such as 3D graphing.

The CX series were released in the same time frame as the Casio Prizm (fx-CG10/20), Casio's color screen graphing calculator with similar features.

The TI-Nspire CX series differ from all previous TI graphing calculator models in that the CX series are the first to use a rechargeable 1,060 mAh lithium-ion battery (upgraded to 1,200 mAh in the 2013 revision). The device is charged via a USB cable. TI claims that the battery requires four hours to charge, that a full charge powers the device for up to two weeks under normal daily use, and that the battery should last up to 3 years before it requires replacement. The battery is user-replaceable.

With the exception of interchangeable TI-84 keypads, the CX series retain all features of the previous TI-Nspire models. The colors of the calculator are still the same as those of the TI-Nspire models; the CX is white and dark blue, while the CX CAS is gray and black. The external connectors have changed slightly. The mini-USB port, located at the center on the top of the TI-Nspire series, has moved to the right on the top on the CX series. On the CX series, TI added a second port immediately left of the mini-USB port, for a new wireless module. The new wireless TI-Nspire Navigator adapter, which allows teachers to monitor students and send files, is not compatible with the previous TI-Nspire models. The third port, located at the bottom of the handheld, is for the TI Charging Dock and Lab Cradle. The keypad layout is very similar to that of the TI-Nspire Touchpad.

The wireless module that wirelessly connects to Navigator.

Both models have 100 MB of user memory and 64 MB of RAM. The retail package comes in a plastic blister case and does not have the full manual, while the teachers edition comes in a box with a TI-Nspire CX poster for classrooms and the full manual (in English and French in the US). Both devices ship with the student/teacher software for Windows/Mac OS X. According to Texas Instruments, The CX is accepted in SAT, IB, AP, ACT and British GCSE and A level exams. The CX CAS is only accepted on certain AP exams.

=== Chinese market ===
Four models aimed for the Chinese market were launched, with specialized features. All four models have Chinese labeled keyboards. The CX-C and CX-C CAS models are similar to CX and CX CAS, but included a concise Chinese-English dictionary. The CM-C and CM-C CAS are cheaper, featured a more stream-lined design, but have only 32 MB of RAM and no port for the wireless module. The systems of the Chinese versions are not interchangeable with those of the international models.

=== TI-Nspire CX II and TI-Nspire CX II CAS ===
In 2019, Texas Instruments introduced the TI-Nspire CX II and TI-Nspire CX II CAS. They feature a slightly different operating system with several enhancements and slightly improved hardware, including Python integration.

The non-CAS version lacks the exact math mode which is included in the CAS version as well as all the models dedicated to the European/China market (T and C versions).

=== European market ===
Like China, the continent of Europe also has models aimed for its market. These calculators include a "-T" after the CX. The CX II-T and CX II-T CAS both have different body color designs than their North American counterparts. One of the main feature differences in the European versions is the inclusion of an exact math engine in both the CAS and the non-CAS version. European models also omit the WiFi adapter port from the top of the calculator.

A picture of the European model of the TI Nspire CX CAS II

== Software ==
Texas Instruments offers several different versions of software for their calculators. They offer CAS and non-CAS versions of their student and teacher software. This software allows users to share results with classmates and teachers and gives the user an emulated version of the TI-Nspire. TI also offers a computer link software for connecting their handheld to their computer to transfer documents. The software allows for the syncing of documents to and from the calculator or computer. This software requires a license in order to be used.

=== Programming languages ===
Beside the TI Basic functionality the Nspire calculators provides functionality to run scripts written in two additional programming languages with the standard TI firmware.

With the release of OS 3.0, the Lua scripting language is supported, allowing 3rd party programs to be run without the need of exploits. There are currently more than 100 third-party programs and functions for the Nspire that introduce new functionality, like Laplace transforms, Fourier transforms, and 3rd and 4th degree differential equations, that are not included by default. The actual LUA Version is 5.1 in OS Version 5.2 (September 2020).

Since firmware version 5.2 it is possible to program and run Python (Version 3.4.0 in September 2020) scripts in an interpreter shell or from the main calculator command line.

Available Python modules
Standard	__main__, ctypes, micropython, array, errno, random, binascii, gc, re, time, builtins, hashlib, sys, cmath, heapq, collections, math
TI	ti_picture, ti_innovator, ti_draw, ti_st

=== Lab Cradle ===
The TI-Nspire Lab Cradle is a Calculator-Based Laboratory system introduced in 1994. It is a portable data collection device for the life sciences. The CBL system was replaced in 1999 by the CBL 2. The TI-Nspire Lab Cradle has three analog and two digital inputs with a sampling rate of up to 100,000 readings per second. The cradle also has 32 MB of storage space to store sensor data. The Lab Cradle allows the TI-Nspire series to communicate with older Calculator-Based Laboratory systems that previous TI calculators used (TI-73 series, TI-82, TI-83 series, TI-85, and TI-86).

The TI-Nspire Lab Cradle used the rechargeable battery of the TI-Nspire and support three different charging options: wall adapter, USB cable to computer and TI-Nspire Cradle Charging Bay. The TI-Nspire Lab Cradle is marketed by Texas Instruments and developed as part of an ongoing business venture between TI and Vernier Software & Technology of Portland, Oregon.

=== Navigator system ===
The navigator system allows teachers to connect multiple TI-Nspire calculators to a computer through the TI-Nspire Access Point and TI-Nspire Navigator Wireless Cradles. The system includes the TI-Nspire cradle charging bay and the main system which looks like a wireless router. The Navigator system was first available when the first generation Nspires were launched, but when the TI-Nspire CX and CX CAS were released, a new wireless adapter was announced that is smaller but not compatible with the TI-Nspire and TI-Nspire Touchpad.

=== Press-to-Test ===
Press-to-Test is a feature that restricts access to the user's documents and certain features of the calculator for a limited time. Its intended purpose is to prevent cheating on tests and exams. Press-to-Test is enabled by pressing a certain button combination when turning on the calculator. The features that are blocked (for example 3D graphs and drag & drop for graphs) can be selectively enabled, but access to existing documents is always prohibited. When the handheld is running in Press-to-Test mode, an LED on top of it blinks to indicate that Press-to-Test is enabled. Press-to-Test can only be disabled by connecting to another calculator or a computer with TI-Nspire compatible software installed. Removing the batteries or pressing the reset button will not disable it.

=== Ndless ===
Ndless (or Ndl3ss for version 3.0) is a third-party jailbreak for the TI-Nspire calculators that allows native programs, such as C, C++, and ARM assembly programs, to run. Ndless was developed initially by Olivier Armand and Geoffrey Anneheim and released in February 2010 for the Clickpad handheld. Organizations such as Omnimaga and TI-Planet promoted Ndless and built a community around Ndless and Ndless programs. With Ndless, low-level operations can be accomplished, for example overclocking, allowing the handheld devices to run faster. Downgrade prevention can be defeated as well. In addition, Game Boy, Game Boy Advance, and Nintendo Entertainment System emulators exist for the handhelds with Ndless. Major Ndless-powered programs also include a port of the game Doom. Unlike Lua scripts, which are supported by Texas Instruments, Ndless is actively counteracted by TI. Each subsequent OS attempts to block Ndless from operating.

== Technical specifications ==
Texas Instruments developed their own proprietary System-On-Chip from the ARM9 32-bit processors. The first generation of the TI-Nspire is based on LSI Corporation's (now Broadcom Inc.) "Zevio" design while the CX and CX II generation is built with Toshiba's Application-Specific Integrated Circuit design.

Most Texas Instruments calculators contain only a non-volatile read-only memory called NAND Flash and a volatile random-access memory called synchronous dynamic random-access memory or SDRAM. The NAND Flash is not executable but contains parts of the operating system. However, the TI-Nspire also uses NOR ROM to store boot instructions for the operating system. Texas Instruments most likely did this to free up the NAND Flash, and SDRAM in the calculator to be used by the user and operating system. The NAND Flash and SDRAM are used to store user and operating system documents.

Previous Texas Instruments calculators had a backup button cell battery used to maintain user information, system information and time and date, between battery changes. This allows a user to keep their information when a battery is removed. Because the TI-Nspire lacks this backup battery, the SDRAM content is deleted whenever the user has to swap the battery out. This necessitates that the calculator load the operating system and file structure from the NAND Flash to the SDRAM, causing a longer loading time.

Despite the overall performance increase between versions of the TI-Nspire, performance differences do exist. The TI-Nspire CX II version lacks 10+ MB of storage space compared to its predecessor. The TI-Nspire CM-C and CM-C CAS (the Chinese versions of the CX and CX CAS) are cheaper and have an updated design, but have only 32 MB of RAM and no port for the wireless module.

	TI-Nspire CAS & Non-CAS	TI-Nspire CX CAS & Non-CAS	TI-Nspire CX II CAS & Non-CAS
Display	320×240 – 4-bit greyscale LCD Dot-Matrix	320×240 or 240×320 – 16-bit color LCD	320×240 or 240×320 – 16-bit color LCD
CPU	ARM926EJ-S 90 MHz/120 MHz	ARM926EJ-S 132 MHz	ARM926EJ-S 396 MHz
SDRAM	32 MB (20 MB user-accessible)	64 MB (64 MB user-accessible)	64 MB (64 MB user-accessible)
NAND Memory	32 MB (16 MB user-accessible)	128 MB (100 MB user-accessible)	128 MB (90+ MB user-accessible)
Flash ROM	512 KB NOR ROM	512 KB NOR ROM	512 KB NOR ROM
Link capability	Mini-USB Sync TI-Nspire Lab Cradle Wireless Network Adapter	Mini-USB Sync TI-Nspire Lab Cradle Wireless Network Adapter	Mini-USB Sync TI-Nspire Lab Cradle Wireless Network Adapter
I/O	Interchangeable Keypads TI-84 Keypad TI-Nspire Keypad	71 Switch Keypad	71 Switch Keypad
Power	4×AAA batteries	Rechargeable 1200 mAh lithium-ion battery	Rechargeable 1200 mAh lithium-ion battery
Release	2007, 2010 (Touchpad version)	2011	2019

== Operating system versions ==
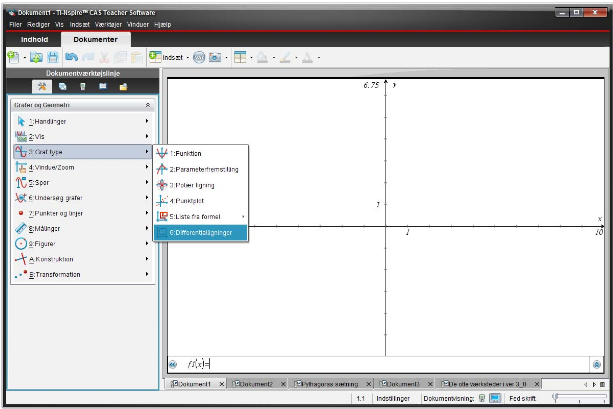
TI-Nspire CAS software can solve differential equations

The TI-Nspire CX/CX CAS calculators are now running the operating system (OS) version 4.5.5.79, released in August 2021. The TI-Nspire CX II/CX II CAS are running version 6.3.0.119, released in August 2025. The operating system has been updated frequently since 2007 (partly due to bugs and missing functions, and also to patch jailbreak exploits), one year after its release in 2006. Version 2.0, 3.0, 4.0, and 5.0 were major upgrades.

=== Added features in OS 2.0 ===
Starting with OS 2.0, additional features were added to increase usability and usefulness of the TI-Nspire. Below are major changes that were made. These features have stayed with the Nspire series to date.

=== Added features in OS 3.0 ===
Images can be included in TI-Nspire documents using the computer software. They can then be displayed on the Nspire calculators and in full color on the Nspire CX calculators. Graphs can be drawn on top of the images. A data collection application is included with the OS, for use with the Lab Cradle. 3D graphing is supported, as well as differential equations. Other features were also added, including improvements to functions that are related to statistics. OS 3.0 also adds the ability to run programs that are written in Lua. OS 3.0.1 introduced a number of bugs, but most of these have been fixed as of 3.0.2.

In OS 3.2, conic equations in standard formats can be graphed and a new chemistry feature, Chem Box, allows users to write chemical notations. OS 3.2 also saw the inclusion of the Chipmunk physics engine for use in Lua programs.

In OS 3.9, the area between curves can now be calculated on the graph bar. The last 3.9 release for the Nspire classics (Clickpad, Touchpad) is 3.9.0.463. The last 3.9 release for the CX and CX CAS calculators is 3.9.1.38.

=== Added features in OS 4.0 ===
OS 4.0 works only for the Nspire CX and CX CAS, not the Nspire classics (Clickpad, Touchpad).

An indicator now displays the angle mode (Degrees, Radians or Gradians) in effect for the current application. In window settings on graphs, exact inputs such as 7/3 or 2*π can now be used for input of custom window settings.

=== Added features in OS 5.0 ===
OS 5.0 is currently exclusive to the CX II/CX II CAS and their -T counterparts. These features were added in this release:

- Animated Path plot
- Modernized user interface
- Dynamic coefficient values
- Points by coordinates
- Tick-mark labels
- Various TI-Basic programming enhancements
- Simplified Disable CAS (CAS model exclusive)
- DeSolve wizard (CAS model exclusive)

=== Added features in OS 5.2 ===
OS 5.2 is currently exclusive to the CX II/CX II CAS and their -T counterparts. These features were added in this release:

- Python programming language support in Host Software and on the calculator.

=== Added features in OS 5.3 ===
OS 5.3 is currently exclusive to the CX II/CX II CAS and their -T counterparts. These features were added in this release:

- Exam support
- Quick set-up code to enter Press-to-Test
- Python programming improvements
- Six TI-authored modules that are additional libraries for Python's functionality. The new modules are:
  - TI Draw
  - TI Plotlib
  - TI Hub
  - TI Rover
  - TI Image
  - TI System

== See also ==
- Comparison of Texas Instruments graphing calculators
- Comparison of computer algebra systems
