= Dot-matrix display =

Type of display device

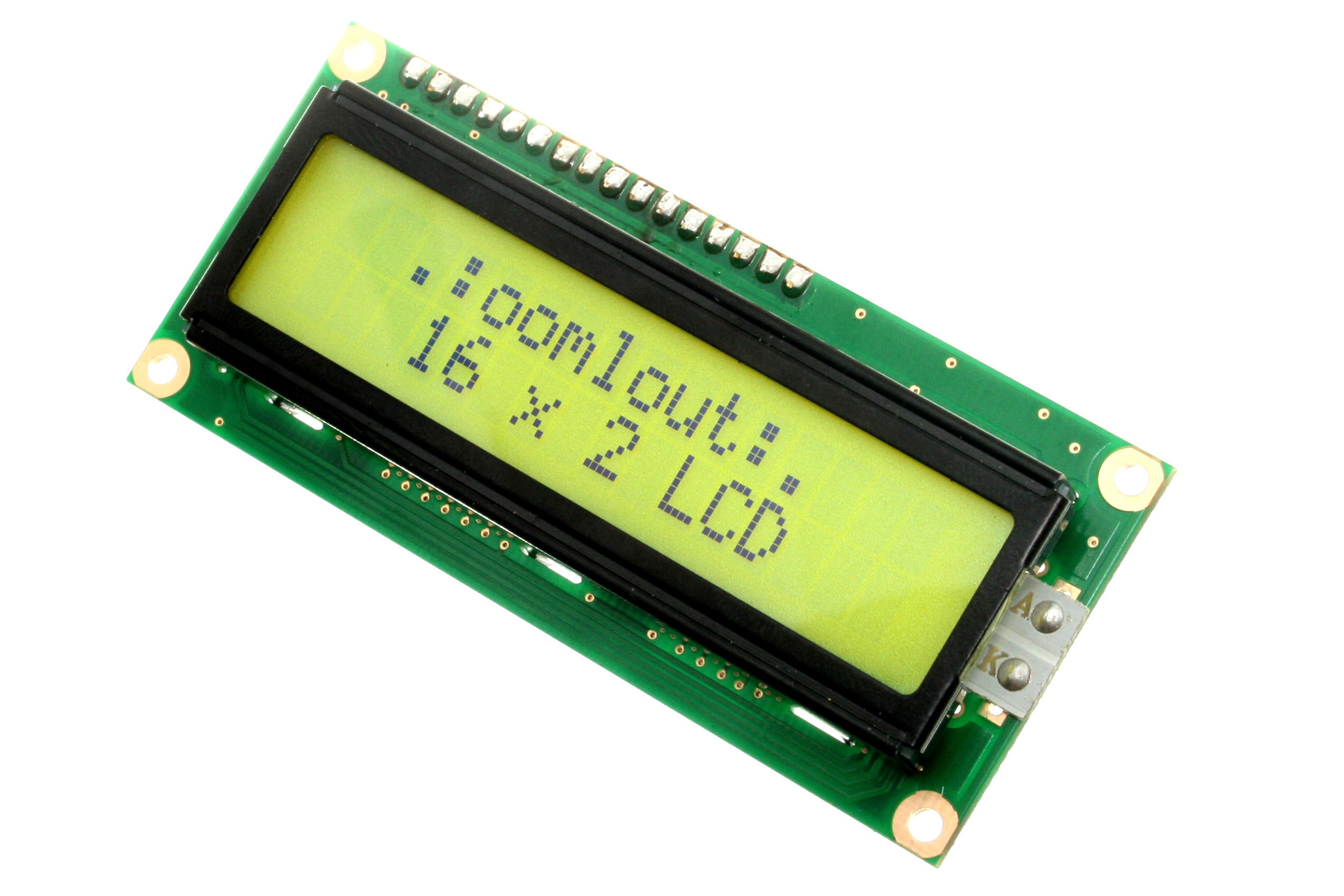
A 16×2-character dot-matrix display, where each character is made from a grid of 5×7 dots

A dot-matrix display is a low-cost electronic digital display device that displays information on machines such as clocks, watches, calculators, and many other devices requiring a simple alphanumeric (and/or graphic) display device of limited resolution.

The display consists of a dot matrix of lights or mechanical indicators arranged in a rectangular configuration (other shapes are also possible, although not common) such that by switching on or off selected dots, text or graphics can be displayed. These displays are normally created using LCD, OLED, or LED technology. Some later VF Displays also use a dot-matrix instead of a Seven-segment display. A dot-matrix display controller converts instructions from a processor into signals that control the individual dots in the matrix so that the required display is produced.

== History ==
In 1913, Frank C Reilly filed a patent application for his Electric display control. In 1914, Danish inventor Viggo Jensen put some of the first signs in Europe into operation.

In London, Daily Express used one of the first examples of real animated dot-matrix built from light bulbs from 1923 on their publishing building. An improved similar screen was later the 1926 proposed Motograph News Bulletin used on Times Square in New York.

The dot-matrix display is also known by the obsolete term "punktmatrix display" (German for dot-matrix) due to the dot matrix being created in Germany by Rudolf Hell in 1925.

In September 1977, the US Army wrote up a form to the Westinghouse Research and Development Center requesting a more energy efficeint display that soldiers could use in their technology in the field. Japan and America were using the LCD matrices to develop Casio TVs from 1984 to 2000 creating and experimenting with different display setups. In the 1980s and 1990s, dot-matrix displays were introduced into several technologies including televisions, computers, video game systems, and pinball machines. Dot-matrix displays were added into new pieces of technology as a background part of LCD or OLED displays as the technology improved.

== Pixel resolutions ==
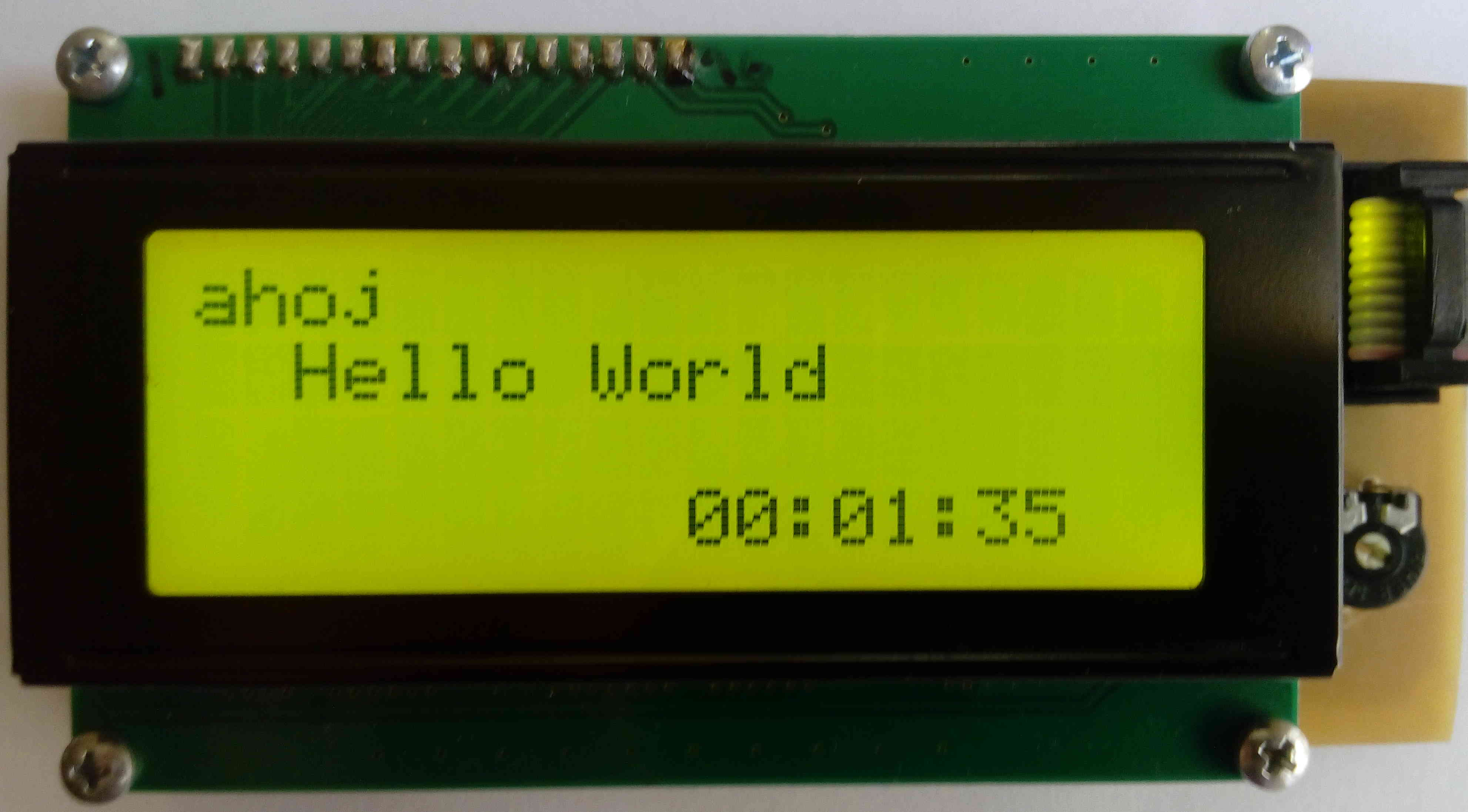
A four-line dot-matrix LCD

Common sizes of dot-matrix displays:

- 128×16 (Two-line)
- 128×32 (Four-line)
- 128×64 (Eight-line)

Other sizes include:

- 92×31 (Four or three-line)

== Character resolutions ==
- A common size for a character is 5×7 pixels, either separated with blank lines with no dots (in most text-only displays), or with lines of blank pixels (making the real size 6×8). This is seen on most graphic calculators, such as Casio calculators or TI-82 and superior. It is also seen on some elevator floor indicators and logic cabinets. (Schindler FI MXB/MXV Indicator & Miconic MX-GC cabinet)
- A smaller size is 3×5 (or 4×6 when separated with blank pixels). This is seen on the TI-80 calculator as a "pure", fixed-size 3×5 font, or on most 7×5 calculators as a proportional (1×5 to 5×5) font. The disadvantage of the 7×5 matrix and smaller is that lower case characters with descenders are not practical. A matrix of 11×9 is often used to give a far superior resolution.
- Dot-matrix displays of sufficient resolution can be programmed to emulate the customary seven-segment numeral patterns.
- A larger size is 5×9 pixels, which is used on many "natural display" calculators, shop checkouts and some Schindler FI MXB elevators.

== See also ==
- Display examples
- Flip-disc display
- Fourteen-segment display
- Hitachi HD44780 LCD controller
- LED panel
- Sixteen-segment display
- The military request form source number 2.
- Detailed manual from SHARP Corporation.
