= TI-80 =

Graphing calculator by Texas Instruments

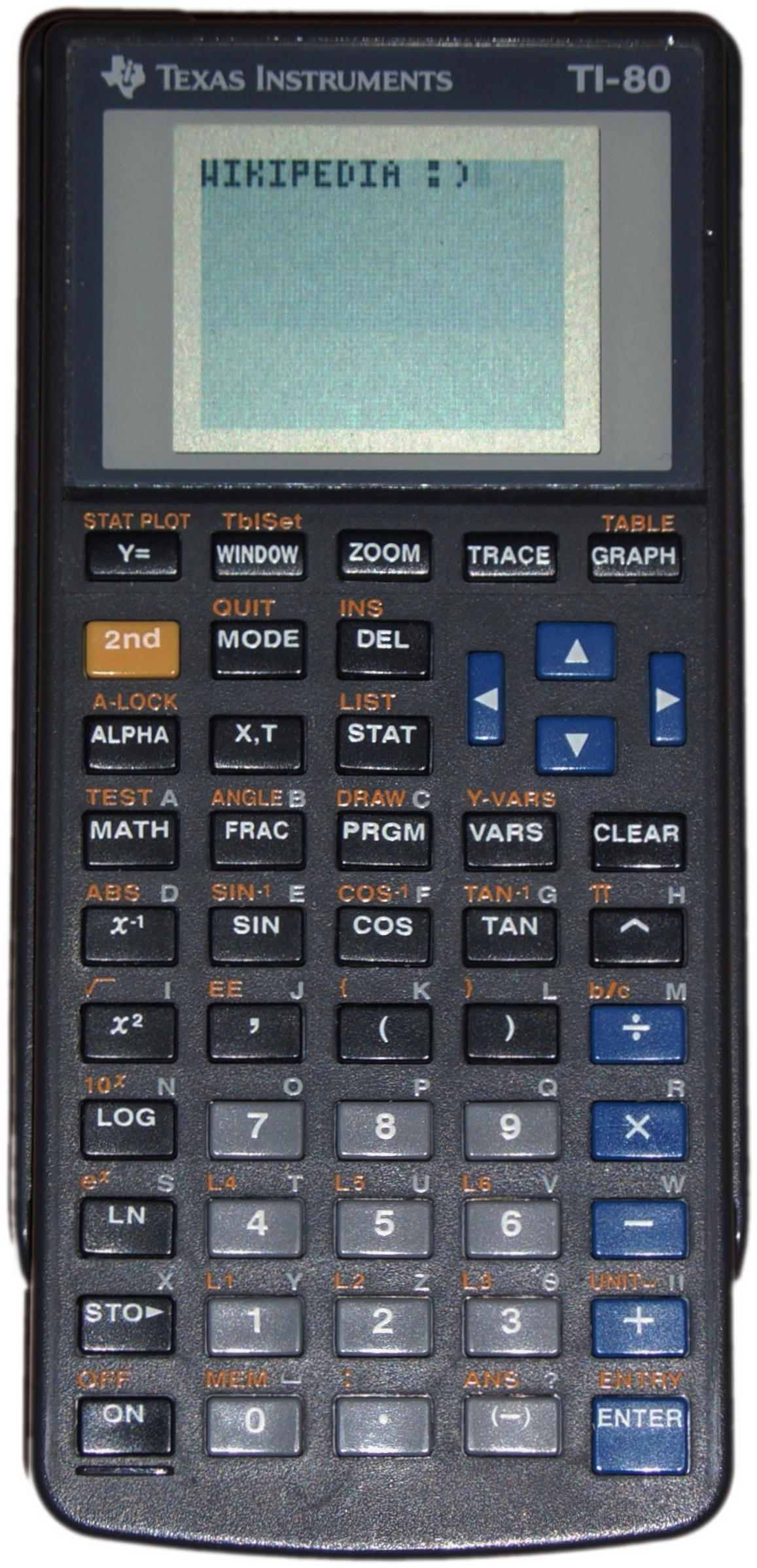
- Type: Graphing calculator
- Manufacturer: Texas Instruments
- Introduced: 1995
- Discontinued: 1998
- Successor: TI-73 series

Calculator
- Entry mode: D.A.L.
- Precision: 13
- Display size: 64×48 pixels, 16×8 characters

CPU
- Processor: Proprietary (on board a Toshiba T6M53 or T6M53A ASIC)
- Frequency: 980 kHz

Programming
- User memory: 7 KB of RAM

Other
- Power supply: 2 CR2032 batteries
- Weight: 106 grams (3.7 oz)
- Dimensions: 163 mm × 71 mm × 15 mm (6.4 in × 2.8 in × 0.60 in)

The TI-80 is a graphing calculator introduced by Texas Instruments in 1995 to be used at a middle school level (grades 6 to 8). It offered advanced capabilities that had previously only been available in high-end scientific calculators to students learning pre-algebra and algebra, and was designed to be affordable for schools.

The oldest Texas Instruments graphing calculator is the TI-81 (released 1990), not the TI-80.

== Design ==
The TI-80 featured a 48 x 64 dot-matrix display with a 5 x 3 pixel font, the smallest screen of any TI graphing calculator. It had the slowest processor (980 kHz) of any TI graphing calculator. The first revision of the TI-80 'A' contained a proprietary Toshiba T6M53 ASIC while subsequent revisions contained a Toshiba T6M53A. Additionally, the TI-80 had the processor on board the ASIC, unlike later calculators like the TI-83, TI-83 Plus, and TI-84 Plus which had separate ASIC and processor chips in certain models. In comparison, the TI-81, released in 1990, featured a 2 MHz Zilog Z80 processor. However, the TI-80 did feature 7 KB of RAM (compared with the TI-81's 2.4 KB). The TI-80 also had more built-in functions than the TI-81 (such as list and table functions, as well as fraction and decimal conversions). Like the TI-81, the TI-80 did not feature a link port on the base model, however, unlike the TI-81, the ViewScreen variant (meant for use with TI's overhead projection units) did. The TI-80 was the only graphing calculator to use 2 CR2032 lithium batteries (instead of the standard 4 AAA batteries with a lithium backup battery).

== Usage ==
Since its release, it was superseded by the superior TI-73 and TI-73 Explorer. The TI-80 was officially discontinued in 1998, when it was replaced by the TI-73, however, production continued until at least October 2000.

As of 2021, the TI-80 remained approved for use on the SAT exam.

== See also ==
- Comparison of Texas Instruments graphing calculators
