= Comparison of Texas Instruments graphing calculators =

This article compares different graphing calculators manufactured by Texas Instruments. Graphing calculators are hand-held calculators capable of plotting graphs and solving complex functions.

The following table compares general and technical information for a selection of Texas Instruments graphing calculators. Many of the calculators in this list have region-specific models that are not individually listed here, such as the TI-84 Plus CE-T, a TI-84 Plus CE designed for non-French European markets. These region-specific models are usually functionally identical to each other, aside from minor cosmetic differences and circuit board hardware revisions. See the individual calculators' articles for further information.

Calculator	CPU	RAM	Display Size	Physical Size (inches)	Contains CAS	Year released	Initial MSRP (nominal US$)	Use on College Board Standardized Tests	Use on ACT Standardized Tests
TI-73, TI-73 Explorer	Zilog Z80 @ 6 MHz	25 KB of RAM, 512 KB of Flash ROM	96 × 64 pixels 16 × 8 characters	7.3 × 3.5 × 1.0	No	1998/2003	95 (TI-73)	Allowed	Allowed
TI-80	980 kHz Proprietary	8 KB of RAM (7 KB user accessible)	64 × 48 pixels 16 × 8 characters	6.4 × 3.0 × 0.9	No	1995	Unknown	Allowed	Allowed
TI-81	Zilog Z80 @ 2 MHz	8 KB of RAM (2.4 KB user accessible)	96 × 64 pixels 16 × 8 characters	6.75 x 3.125 x 1.0	No	1990	110	Allowed	Allowed
TI-82	Zilog Z80 @ 6 MHz	28 KB of RAM	96 × 64 pixels 16 × 8 characters	6.9 × 3.4 × 1.0	No	1993	125	Allowed	Allowed
TI-83	Zilog Z80 @ 6 MHz	32 KB of RAM	96 × 64 pixels 16 × 8 characters	7.3 × 3.5 × 1.0	No	1996	125	Allowed	Allowed
TI-83 Plus	Zilog Z80 @ 6 MHz	32 KB of RAM (24 KB user accessible), 512 KB of Flash ROM (160 KB user accessible)	96 × 64 pixels 16 × 8 characters	7.3 × 3.5 × 1.0	No	1999	104.99	Allowed	Allowed
TI-83 Plus Silver Edition	Zilog Z80 @ 6 MHz/15 MHz (Dual Speed)	128 KB of RAM (24 KB user accessible), 2 MB of Flash ROM (1.5 MB user accessible)	96 × 64 pixels 16 × 8 characters	7.3 × 3.5 × 1.0	No	2001	129.95	Allowed	Allowed
TI-83 Premium CE, TI-83 Premium CE Edition Python	Zilog eZ80 @ 48 MHz	256 KB of RAM (150 KB user accessible), 4 MB of Flash ROM (3 MB user accessible)	320 × 240 pixels 26 × 10 characters (large font)	7.6 × 3.4 × 0.75	No	2015/2019	~150 (€129)	Allowed	Allowed
TI-84 Plus	Zilog Z80 @ 15 MHz	128/48 KB of RAM (24 KB user accessible), 1 MB of Flash ROM (480 KB user accessible)	96 × 64 pixels 16 × 8 characters	7.5 × 3.3 × 0.9	No	2004	109.99	Allowed	Allowed
TI-84 Plus Silver Edition	Zilog Z80 @ 15 MHz	128/48 KB of RAM (24 KB user accessible), 2 MB of Flash ROM (1.5 MB user accessible)	96 × 64 pixels 16 × 8 characters	7.5 × 3.3 × 0.9	No	2004	129.99	Allowed	Allowed
TI-84 Plus C Silver Edition	Zilog Z80 @ 15 MHz	128 KB of RAM (21 KB user accessible), 4 MB of Flash ROM (3.5 MB user accessible)	320 × 240 pixels 26 × 10 characters (large font)	7.5 × 3.3 × 0.9	No	2013	150	Allowed	Allowed
TI-84 Plus CE, TI-84 Plus CE Python	Zilog eZ80 @ 48 MHz	256 KB of RAM (154 KB user accessible), 4 MB of Flash ROM (3 MB user accessible)	320 × 240 pixels 26 × 10 characters (large font)	7.6 × 3.4 × 0.75	No	2015/2021	150	Allowed	Allowed
TI-84 Evo	ARM Cortex @ 156 MHz	256 KB of RAM (154 KB user accessible), 4 MB of Flash ROM (3 MB user accessible)	319 × 209 pixels 26 × 10 characters (large font)	7.6 x 3.4 x 0.81	No	2026	150	Allowed	Allowed
TI-85	Zilog Z80 @ 6 MHz	28 KB of RAM	128 × 64 pixels 21 × 8 characters	6.875 x 3.31 x 0.938	No	1992	130	Allowed	Allowed
TI-86	Zilog Z80 @ 6 MHz	128 KiB of RAM	128 × 64 pixels 21 × 8 characters	7.3 × 3.5 × 1.0	No	1996	150	Allowed	Allowed
TI-89	Motorola 68000 @ 10 MHz/12 MHz (nominal)	256 KiB of RAM (188 KB user accessible), 2 MiB of Flash ROM	160 × 100 pixels	7.3 × 3.5 × 1.0	Yes	1998	159.99	Not Allowed	Not Allowed
TI-89 Titanium	Motorola 68000 @ ≤16 MHz	256 KiB of RAM (188 KB user accessible), 2.7 MB of Flash ROM	160 × 100 pixels	7.5 × 3.3 × 0.9	Yes	2004	149.99	Not Allowed	Not Allowed
TI-92, TI-92 II	Motorola 68000 @ 10 MHz	68 KB of RAM/136 KB of ROM (No Flash, requires Plus Module)	240 × 128 pixels	4.7 x 8.2 x 1.5	Yes	1995/1996	200 (TI-92)	Not Allowed	Not Allowed
TI-92 Plus	Motorola 68000 @ 12 MHz	256 KB of RAM (188 KB user accessible), 384 KB of Flash ROM	240 × 128 pixels	4.7 × 8.2 × 1.5	Yes	1998	179.99	Not Allowed	Not Allowed
Voyage 200	Motorola 68000 @ 12 MHz	256 KB of RAM (188 KB user accessible), 2.7 MB of Flash ROM	240 × 128 pixels	4.6 × 7.3 × 1.2	Yes	2002	129.99	Not Allowed	Not Allowed
TI-Nspire, TI-Nspire CAS	ARM9 @ 90 MHz/120 MHz	32 MB RAM (16 MB user accessible), 32 MB of Flash ROM (20 MB user accessible)	320 × 240 pixels (16-shade grayscale)	7.90625 × 3.9375 × 0.96875	Only CAS model	2007 (CAS: 2010)	149 (CAS: 159)	Only non-CAS model is allowed	Only non-CAS model is allowed
TI-Nspire CX, TI-Nspire CX CAS	ARM9 @ 132 MHz	64 MB of RAM, 128 MB of Flash ROM (100 MB user accessible)	320 × 240 pixels (16-bit color)	7.5625 × 3.59375 × 0.75	Only CAS model	2011	154.99 (CAS: 162.99)	Only non-CAS model is allowed	Only non-CAS model is allowed
TI-Nspire CX II, TI- Nspire CX II CAS	ARM9 @ 396 MHz	64 MB of RAM, 128 MB of Flash ROM (100 MB user accessible)	320 × 240 pixels (16-bit color)	7.5625 × 3.59375 × 0.75	Only CAS model	2019	165 (CAS: 175)	Only non-CAS model is allowed	Only non-CAS model is allowed
Calculator	CPU	RAM	Display Size	Physical Size	Contains CAS	Year released	Initial MSRP (nominal US$)	Use on College Board Standardized Tests	Use on ACT Standardized Tests

== Programming language support ==
Calculator	TI-BASIC	Native code	Lua	Python
TI-73, TI-73 Explorer	Yes	Yes	No	No
TI-80	Yes	Only using exploits	No	No
TI-81	Yes	Only using exploits	No	No
TI-82	Yes	Only using exploits	No	No
TI-83	Yes	Yes	No	No
TI-83 Plus	Yes	Yes	No	No
TI-83 Plus Silver Edition	Yes	Yes	No	No
TI-83 Premium CE	Yes	Varies by firmware (Note: Exploits required on OS version 5.5.5 and later.)	No	Only with a TI-Python adapter
TI-83 Premium CE Edition Python	Yes	Varies by firmware	No	Yes
TI-84 Plus	Yes	Yes	No	No
TI-84 Plus Silver Edition	Yes	Yes	No	No
TI-84 Plus C Silver Edition	Yes	Yes	No	No
TI-84 Plus CE	Yes	Varies by firmware	No	No
TI-84 Plus CE Python	Yes	Varies by firmware	No	Yes
TI-85	Yes	Only using exploits	No	No
TI-86	Yes	Yes	No	No
TI-89	Yes	Yes	No	No
TI-89 Titanium	Yes	Yes	No	No
TI-92, TI-92 II	Yes	Only using exploits	No	No
TI-92 Plus	Yes	Yes	No	No
Voyage 200	Yes	Yes	No	No
TI-Nspire, TI-Nspire CAS	Yes	Only using exploits	Yes	Only using exploits
TI-Nspire CX, TI-Nspire CX CAS	Yes	Only using exploits	Yes	Only using exploits
TI-Nspire CX II, TI- Nspire CX II CAS	Yes	Only using exploits	Yes	Yes

== See also ==
- Comparison of HP graphing calculators
