= Vernier Science Education =

American educational software company

- Formerly: Vernier Software & Technology
- Company type: Private
- Industry: Education technology; Educational software
- Founded: 1981; 45 years ago
- Founders: David and Christine Vernier
- Headquarters: Beaverton, Oregon, U.S.
- Key people: Jill Hedrick (CEO)
- Number of employees: 118
- Website: www.vernier.com

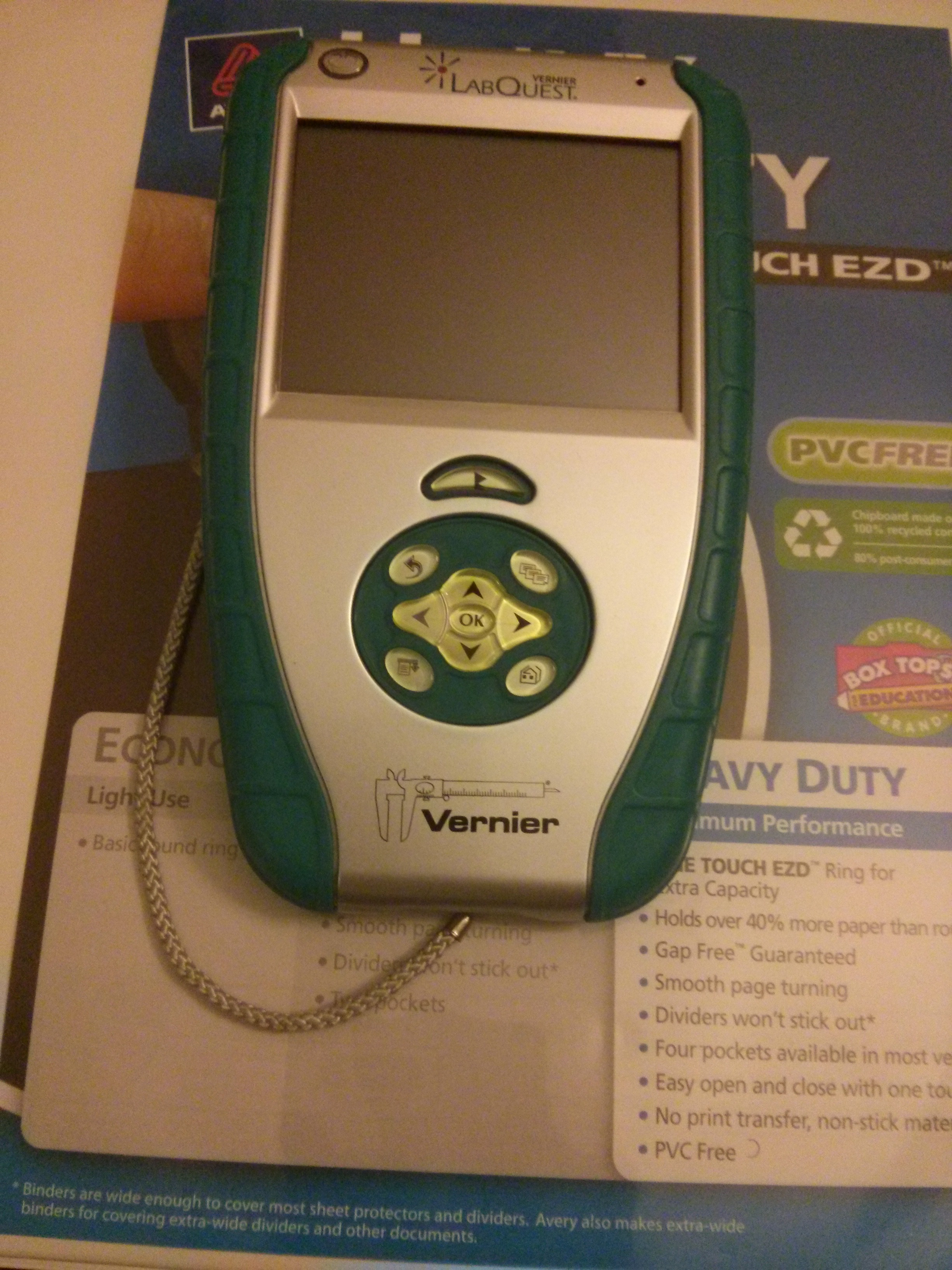
A Vernier LabQuest, a standalone interface used in science education for data collection and analysis

Vernier Science Education is an American educational software company located in Beaverton, Oregon, that produces sensor devices and graphing equipment.

== History ==
Vernier Software & Technology was founded in 1981 in Portland, Oregon, at the home of David Vernier, a high-school physics teacher, and Christine Vernier, a local business manager. David Vernier became acquainted with the use of computers and sensor technology, known as "probeware" or "Microcomputer Based Labs" (MBL), after attending a workshop at the Oregon Graduate Center. This workshop inspired him to found Vernier Software & Technology.

The first software programs developed by Vernier were scientific simulations for Apple II computers. He originally developed the programs for use in his physics classes, but later decided to sell them. His wife took out an advertisement in a newspaper and the programs became popular. Vernier Software & Technology was incorporated as a company in 1981, with David as CEO. Christine originally handled the business aspect of the company. David took a leave of absence from teaching and began working at the company full time in 1984.

Gradually, the company began making software for MS-DOS and Macintosh computers. In the late 1980s, the company started producing assembled temperature sensors and many other types of sensors, such as photogates and motion detectors for studying moving objects. Vernier collaborates with Texas Instruments to develop the Calculator-Based Laboratory (CBL).

Oregon Business Magazine called the company of the "100 Best Places to Work in Oregon" in 2010, and one of the "Best Green Companies in Oregon" in 2009. In 2008, the company partnered with Lego Education to allow sensors to be used with Lego Mindstorms NXT. It also partnered with Tufts University, National Instruments and Carnegie Mellon University. Barack Obama visited the company during his 2008 presidential campaign.

Vernier stepped down as CEO in 2015, and was replaced by John Wheeler.

In August 2022, the company announced that it had changed its name from Vernier Software & Technology to Vernier Science Education. That year, it launched Vernier Connections, a website with science projects and educational material.

Jill Hedrick became CEO of the company in 2024.

Vernier Science Education funds the Vernier Technology Laboratory at the Oregon Museum of Science and Industry, and the Vernier Science Center at Portland State University. The company also presents the annual Vernier Technology Awards to seven teachers at the National Science Teachers Association convention.
