= TI-73 series =

Series of graphing calculators

TI-73
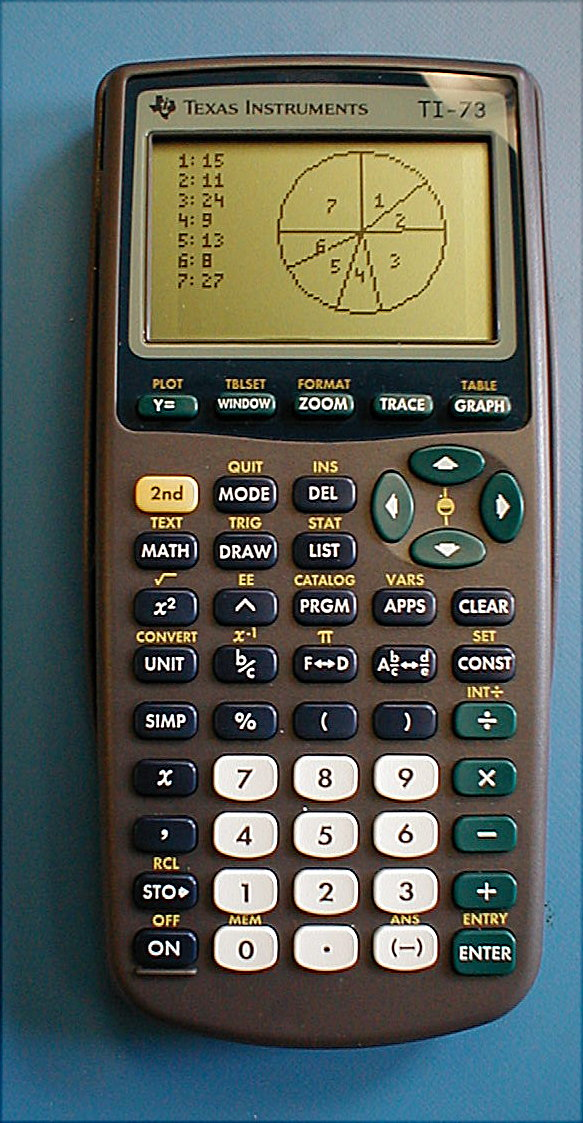
- TI-73
- Type: Graphing calculator
- Manufacturer: Texas Instruments
- Introduced: 1998
- Latest firmware: 1.60
- Predecessor: TI-80
- Successor: TI-73 Explorer

Calculator
- Entry mode: D.A.L.

CPU
- Processor: Zilog Z80
- Frequency: 6 MHz

Programming
- Programming language(s): TI-BASIC
- User memory: 25 KB RAM; 64 KB flash ROM
- Firmware memory: 512 KB

Other
- Power supply: 4 AAA's, 1 CR1616 or CR1620
- Weight: 182 grams (6.4 oz)
- Dimensions: 183 mm × 81 mm × 20 mm (7.2 in × 3.2 in × 0.80 in)

TI-73 Explorer
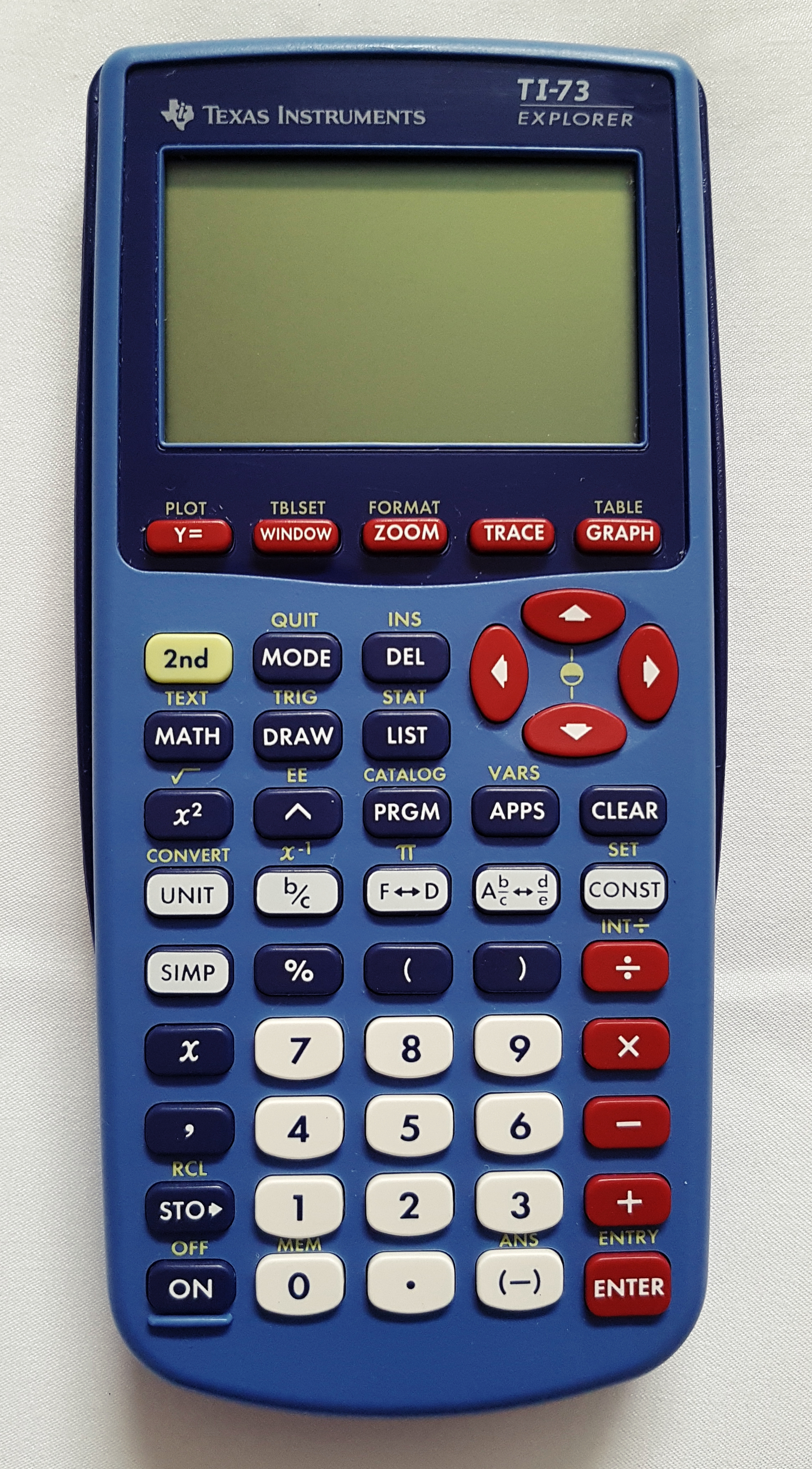
- Type: Graphing calculator
- Manufacturer: Texas Instruments
- Introduced: 2003
- Latest firmware: 1.91
- Predecessor: TI-73

Calculator
- Entry mode: D.A.L.
- Precision: 14

CPU
- Processor: Zilog Z80
- Frequency: 6 MHz

Programming
- Programming language(s): TI-BASIC
- User memory: 25 KB RAM; 128 KB flash ROM
- Firmware memory: 512 KB

Other
- Power supply: 4 AAA's, 1 CR1620
- Weight: 182 grams (6.4 oz)
- Dimensions: 183 mm × 81 mm × 20 mm (7.2 in × 3.2 in × 0.80 in)

The TI 73 series is a series of graphing calculators made by Texas Instruments, all of which have identical hardware.

The original TI-73 graphing calculator was originally designed in 1998 as a replacement for the TI-80 for use at a middle school level (grades 6-8). Its primary advantage over the TI-80 is its 512 KB of flash memory, which holds the calculator's operating system and thereby allows the calculator to be upgraded. Other advantages over the TI-80 are the TI-73's standard sized screen (as opposed to the TI-80's smaller screen), the addition of a link port, 25 KB of RAM (as compared to the TI-80's 7 KB of RAM), and a faster 6 MHz Zilog Z80 processor (as compared with the TI-80's 980 kHz proprietary processor). The TI-73 also uses the standard 4 AAA batteries with a lithium backup battery (instead of the TI-80's 2 CR2032 lithium batteries).

In 2003, the TI-73 was redesigned with a new body shape and redesignated the TI-73 Explorer to indicate its currently intended use as a bridge between the TI-15 Explorer and similar calculators and the TI-83 Plus, TI-84 Plus, and similar calculators. Later, the TI-73 Explorer was remodeled to resemble the TI-84 Plus graphing calculator more closely.

Due to lack of demand in middle schools, the TI-73 and TI-73 Explorer have not been huge sellers for TI and are not carried by most retail stores. Most American upper-level middle school algebra courses generally tend to use the TI-83 or TI-84 families instead of the TI-73 or TI-73 Explorer, while most basic middle school math courses generally do not use graphing calculators, instead opting for scientific calculators such as the TI-30 or TI-34 families.

Originally the TI-73 could only run programs written in TI-BASIC, although that has changed in recent years. In 2005, an assembly shell called Mallard was released for the TI-73. Mallard allows the user to run programs written in assembly language. As with the TI-82 and the TI-85 before, a hacked backup file is downloaded containing the assembly shell.

Released in late 2008, the Windows utility Chameleon allows a user to load the TI-73 Explorer with a slightly modified TI-83+ firmware, giving it nearly equivalent functionality.

In 2009, Texas Instruments updated the skin of the TI-73 Explorer to match the shape of the larger TI-84 Plus's case. This resulted in a slight increase in mass from 182 grams to 208 grams. The hardware and software remained unchanged and is identical to an older unit wearing the TI-83 plus style casing.

== Technical specifications ==
- CPU: Zilog Z80 CPU, 6 MHz
- Flash ROM: 512 KB with 128 KB available for Flash Applications
- RAM: 32 KB with 25 KB available to the user
- Display: Text: 16×8 characters
- I/O
  - Link port
  - 50 button built-in interface
- Power: 4 AAA batteries plus 1 lithium battery for backup
- Integrated programming languages: TI-BASIC

== See also ==
- Comparison of Texas Instruments graphing calculators
