= Casio Algebra FX Series =

Series of Casio graphing calculators

Casio Algebra FX 2.0 Plus
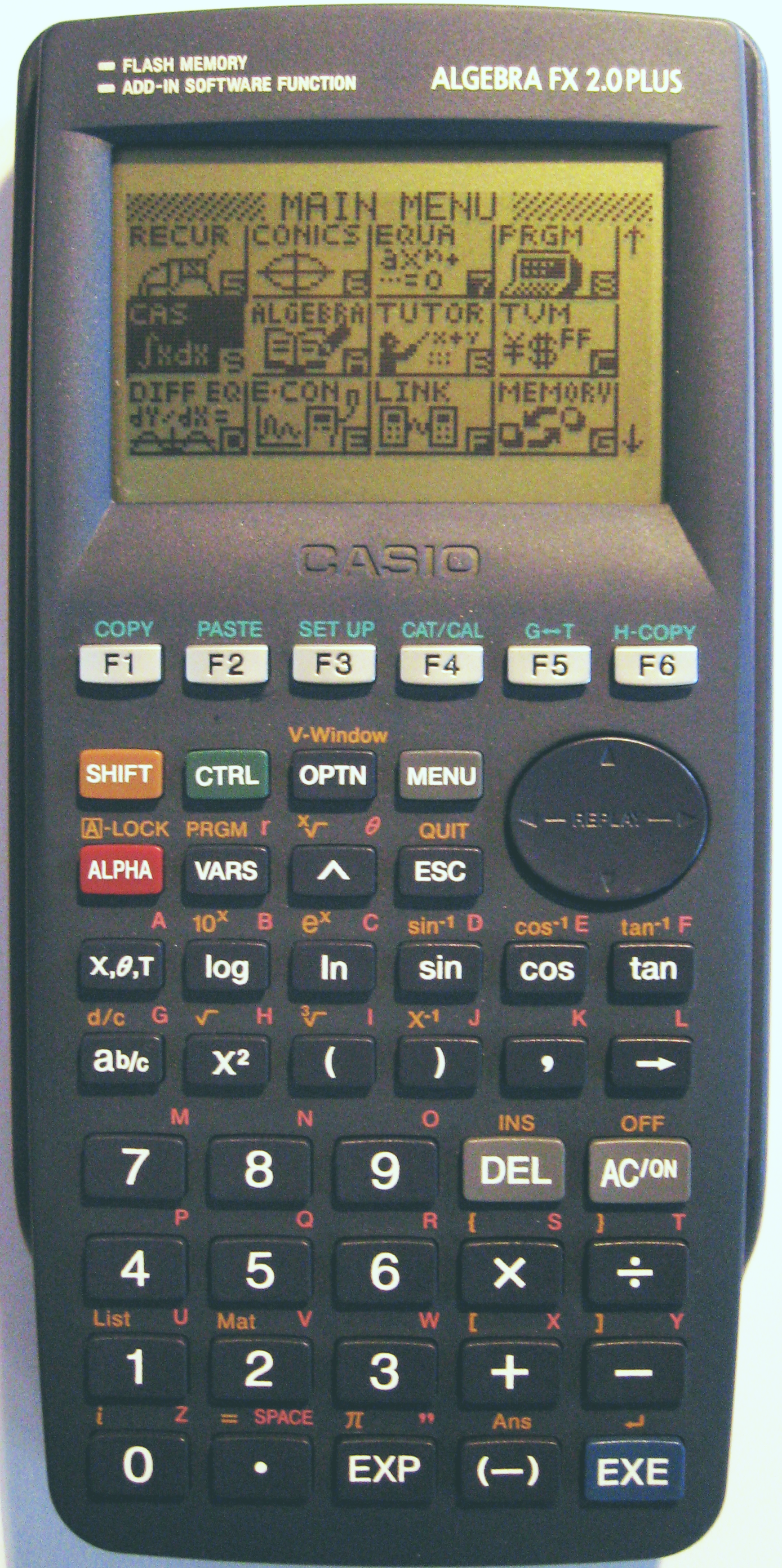
- A graphing calculator from Casio, the Casio Algebra FX 2.0 Plus
- Type: Programmable Graphing
- Manufacturer: Casio
- Introduced: 2001

Calculator
- Entry mode: Infix
- Display type: LCD Dot-matrix
- Display size: 128×64 dots

Programming
- Programming language(s): Casio BASIC
- User memory: 146 KB of RAM, 768 KB of Flash Memory

Other
- Power supply: 4 AAA alkaline batteries, 1 CR-2032 lithium battery
- Weight: 213 gram
- Dimensions: 19.5 mm (H) × 82 mm (W) × 178 mm (D)

The Casio Algebra FX series was a line of graphing calculators manufactured by Japanese electronics company Casio Computer Co., Ltd from 1999 to 2003. They were the successor models to the CFX-9970G, the first Casio calculator with computer algebra system, or CAS, a program for symbolic manipulation of mathematical expressions. The calculators were discontinued and succeeded by the Casio ClassPad 300 in 2003.

== History ==
In 1999, Casio released a graphing calculator called the Algebra FX 2.0. A more capable variant called Algebra FX 2.0 Plus was released in 2001 with additional functionalities for financial calculation, statistics, and differential equations. The calculators were designed for usage in the classroom, where target markets were students and educators. They were aimed at helping students learn to solve algebra problems, where step-by-step solutions could be auto-generated.

The Algebra FX series was the successor of the CFX-9970G, the first Casio calculator with computer algebra system (CAS) released in 1998. The computer algebra system in the Algebra FX series had been largely improved from the previous model so that more mathematical functions were added. The Casio's CAS was mainly developed by its R&D team and Professor John Kenelly of Clemson University.

The calculators were sold to different parts of the world. Casio had used different product names in France, following their French predecessors. The Graph 100 and the Graph 100+ were respectively special variants of the Algebra FX 2.0 and the Algebra FX 2.0 Plus tailored to the French market. The Algebra FX 2.0 Plus was discontinued in 2003 and succeeded by the Casio ClassPad series, which has a stylus-based touch screen. However, the Graph 100+ continued to be sold in France until 2015, until Casio removed the product from its website.

== Specifications ==
=== Power, dimensions ===
The calculators are powered by four AAA batteries used for primary power. It also uses one lithium battery CR2032 for a memory backup when the primary power is down. All program memories will be deleted if both primary power and memory backup power are removed or down. The calculators consume power at the rate of 0.2 W. Based on the manufacturer's data sheet, zinc-carbon R03 AAA batteries and alkaline LR03 batteries can supply power for 140 hours and 230 hours for continuous display of main menu. The back-up battery can operate for about two years.

The calculators weigh about 213 grams including batteries. Their dimensions are 19.5 mm (H) × 82 mm (W) × 178 mm (D).

=== Display, keyboard ===
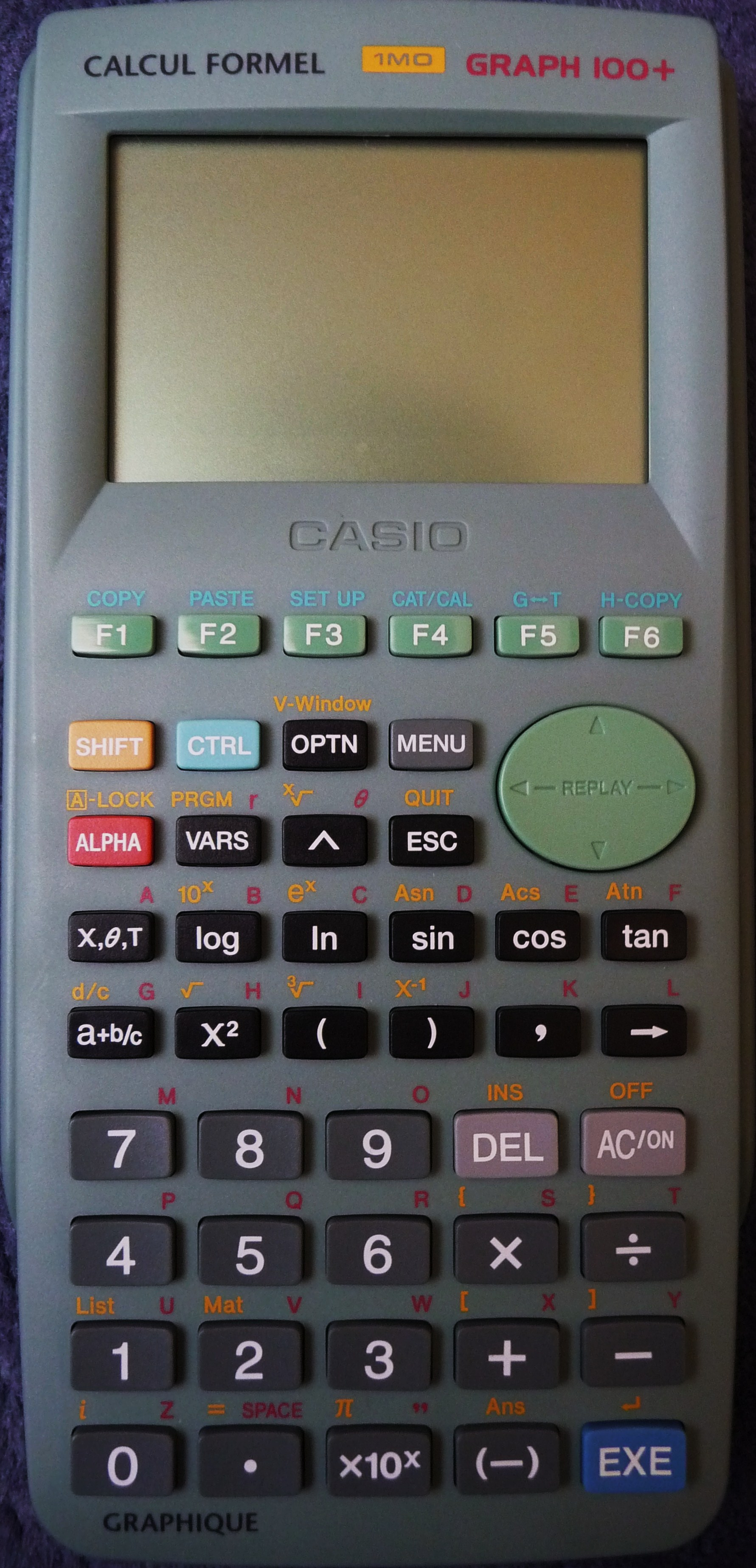
Casio Graph 100+ (France)

The Algebra FX 2.0 incorporates a black-and-white LCD Dot-Matrix display with a graphic resolution of 128 by 64 pixels. The calculator can display up to 21 characters on each of its 8 display lines. The main menu consists of icons referring to different operating modes and applications. Inside each mode, the bottom line is reserved for up to 6 function key menu shortcuts, which can be selected from buttons F1 to F6 on the calculator's keyboard. The display's contrast can be adjusted from the system manager menu.

The calculator's keyboard can be separated into the lower, middle, and top parts. The lower part of the keyboard consists of numeric and operational keys, where the EXE button is used to execute calculations and select commands. The middle part contains more sophisticated mathematical function keys, SHIFT and ALPHA keys, and directional pads. The SHIFT and ALPHA keys are used to access functions and alphabets appearing on top of buttons. The top part consists of buttons F1 to F6, used to select function menu tips.

In terms of keypads, there are two main differences between the Algebra FX 2.0 and its French version, the Graph 100+. In the Graph 100+, the buttons EXP and a^{b}/_{c} are replaced by ×10^{x} and a+^{b}/_{c}, respectively.

=== Memory, processor ===
The calculators come with a main program memory (RAM) of 146 kilobytes and a storage flash memory of 768 kilobytes. It was the first time that Casio adopted a flash storage into its calculator. The program memory is used to store program files, calculator settings, and variables for matrices, statistics, graphs, tables, equations, etc. The storage memory is used to stored add-in applications, which can be loaded through a computer. Memory usage with listed categories can be viewed from a system manager menu.

For hardware, the calculators contain three different memory chips: two of read-only memory (ROM), a mask ROM and a flash ROM, and one of random-access memory (RAM). The mask ROM is where the calculators store their operating system. It has a size of 4 megabytes from a chip R27T3202L manufactured by Oki Electric Industry. Since the mask ROM is non-reprogrammable, the calculator operating system cannot be upgraded, unlike the newer Casio calculators. The flash ROM is a LP62S2048AX chip from AMIC Technology. It has an actual size of 1 megabyte and is reprogrammable. The RAM is a 29LV800CBTI chip from Macronix International. Its capacity is 256 kilobytes. They are all placed on the same motherboard.

The Algebra FX series runs on a 16-bit microprocessor, the NEC V30MX. The microprocessor is tuned at a clock frequency of 8 megahertz and supports the Intel 8088 instruction set.

== Features ==
=== Graphing ===
The Algebra FX series is capable of generating different types of two-dimensional plots. Compatible graphs include rectangular one-variable functions, polar equations, parametric equations, and inequalities, where users can store and plot simultaneously up to 20 graphs. The composite functions made of up to 5 other functions can also be drawn. The calculators provide options to control what appears on a graph screen including graph range and zoom functions. Curves on the graph can be traced by a cursor, where local maximum, local minimum, and intersections of the curves can be solved by a graph solver tool.

Conics having their axes parallel to x-axis or y-axis can be plotted through a separate application. This means that the calculators cannot plot other conic/quadratic equations $Ax^2+Bxy+Cy^2+Dx+Ey+F=0$ where $B$ is not equal to 0. The Algebra FX series cannot plot any implicit function of two variables, while the Texas Instrument's TI-89 series can.

In addition to the simple graphing tool, the calculator also provides a dynamic graph mode, where real-time changes of the graphs, affected by changes in variables and coefficients, are visualized.

=== Equation Solver ===
In the equation solver mode, the Algebra FX series is able to solve simultaneous linear equations, polynomials, and arbitrary equations. The calculator can solve simultaneous linear equations up to 30 unknown variables and polynomials of degrees up to 30. This was a huge improvement from its predecessor CFX-9970G, where only six variables are accepted for simultaneous linear equations and three is the maximum degree the polynomials can take. Casio also introduced a new solve module of arbitrary input equations for the first time. Given an initial starting value and range, the module will calculate one nearby root and return to the users.

=== Computer Algebra System ===
The Casio's computer algebra system (CAS) was first developed for the CFX-9970G in 1998. The following are the functionalities of the CAS in the CFX-9970G:

- Expansion, factorization, collection, and combination of algebraic expressions
- Sum and product of sequences
- Integration, differentiation, and tangent expression of functions.

In the Algebra FX series, the computer algebra system was largely improved from its predecessor. The new features include calculating limits, Taylor's series, arc lengths, etc.

There are some reported bugs of the calculator's computer algebra system. For instance, the calculators incorrectly calculate a third order Taylor's polynomial for $\cos \sqrt x$ with respect to $x = 0$ by returning $1$ instead of $1-x/2+x^2/24-x^3/720$.

=== Communication ===
The Algebra FX series has an ability to communicate with both other calculators in the same series and personal computers. The device can link to another device via a SB-62 cable, a cable where both ends are 2.5 mm stereo jacks. The communication is managed by the data communication program inside the calculators, where users can choose between transmitting and receiving modes. The users are able to transfer various types of data such as programs, equations, and graphs from one calculator to another. The calculators can send and receive with a speed up to 38.4 kbit/s (kilobits per second) for general data and 9.6 kbit/s for screenshots. The communication is in a form of the half-duplex asynchronous serial communication without a parity bit. The device can also communicate with a CASIO label printer via the SB-62 cable, where screenshots can be printed.

The calculators can also communicate with the PCs via a SB-87 or SB-88 cable. Both cables have a 2.5 mm stereo jack at one end and a DB-9 connector for the SB-87 and a USB port for the SB-88 at the other end. The communication is in the same form and speed as in the calculator to calculator communication. The PC programs that deal with the communication are the FA-123 and FA-124 (newer version) PC-Link, where transfers of data and screenshots are managed.

On the technical side, the SB-87 cable is based on a US patent 5504864, where the technology was previously used in the Casio's digital diary models. The cable was designed to shift the voltage from 6 volts at the calculator's end to 12 volts at the PC's RS-232 end. The chip MAX232 or MAX233 by Maxim Integrated was a core component used to level-shift the voltages between the RS-232 and TTL standards. The SB-88 cable was later developed to embed a USB port into the cable.

The Plus model can communicate with the Casio data analyzer EA-100 via the SB-62 cable. The data loggers are capable of sampling and collecting data such as voltage, temperature, light intensity, motion, and sound from the environment via available probes. The same features are also seen in other calculator manufacturers such as the Texas Instrument's Calculator-Based Laboratory and the Hewlett Packard's StreamSmart.

=== Additional features for the Plus version ===
The modified model Algebra FX 2.0 Plus was released in 2001 with additional functionalities. The features added are advanced statistics calculations, financial calculations, differential equations, EA-100 data logging, and tutorial modes. They can be accessed from the main calculator menu.

In the Advanced Statistics Calculation application, the calculators are able to perform different types of regression analysis, where corresponding tests, confidence intervals, and distributions can be determined. Different types of tests, including Z-test, T-test, χ^{2}-test, and F-test, can be calculated based on inputted data, along with ANOVA analysis. Moreover, the calculators also support calculations of probability density and cumulative probability in the given basic probability distributions.

Though not as competent as the dedicated financial calculators in the market, the Algebra FX 2.0 Plus includes capabilities in calculating simple interest, compound interest, cash flow analysis, amortization, and interest rate conversion. Apart from basic financial calculations, depreciation and bond analysis are also supported.

All additional functionalities appeared in the Algebra FX 2.0 Plus, except the tutorial mode, are carried to its successor line, the Casio Classpad series.

== Programming ==
The Algebra FX series is capable of compiling programs inside a Program menu. The calculators employ a BASIC-based programming language, unofficially named as Casio-BASIC. As the language has a linear structure, commands and calculations are executed line-by-line sequentially. Casio-BASIC also supports program flow control syntaxes, including a conditional jump IF, a loop control FOR, a conditional loop control WHILE, a program control CTRL, and a logical operation LOGIC.

Programs can be entered manually on the calculators by the users, where they can select control functions from function key menu tips at the bottom of the screen. In addition to functions appeared in BASIC programming, the calculators support usages of many mathematical functions in many areas, such as exponentials, trigonometry, linear algebra, and calculus. Correspondingly, the calculators can store different types of data, including lists, tables, graphs, and matrices, in the main memories so that users can recall them later.

Apart from displaying texts as outputs on the screen, the calculators are able to illustrate graphics. For instance, lines and circles can be drawn directly into the screen either by controlling each pixel individually or by calling readymade functions.

Under the calculator's built-in file management, all programs can be password-protected from editing and execution.

== Use in schools ==
=== United Kingdom ===
The Joint Council for Qualifications (JCQ), a council providing GCSE and GCE (O- and A- Level) and Highers, are prohibiting calculators with symbolic algebra manipulation and symbolic differentiation/integration from the examinations. Therefore, the Algebra FX 2.0 series is not allowed due to its computer algebra system (CAS).

=== United States ===
In the United States, the Algebra FX 2.0 and the Algebra FX 2.0 Plus are allowed by the College Board on the SAT, the SAT Subject Tests in Mathematics, and AP examinations in Biology, Calculus, Chemistry, Physics, and Statistics. However, the calculators are banned from the ACT examination due to their capability in the computer algebra system (CAS).
