= Casio Prizm =

Series of graphing calculators from Casio

Casio PRIZM series Casio Classwiz CG Series
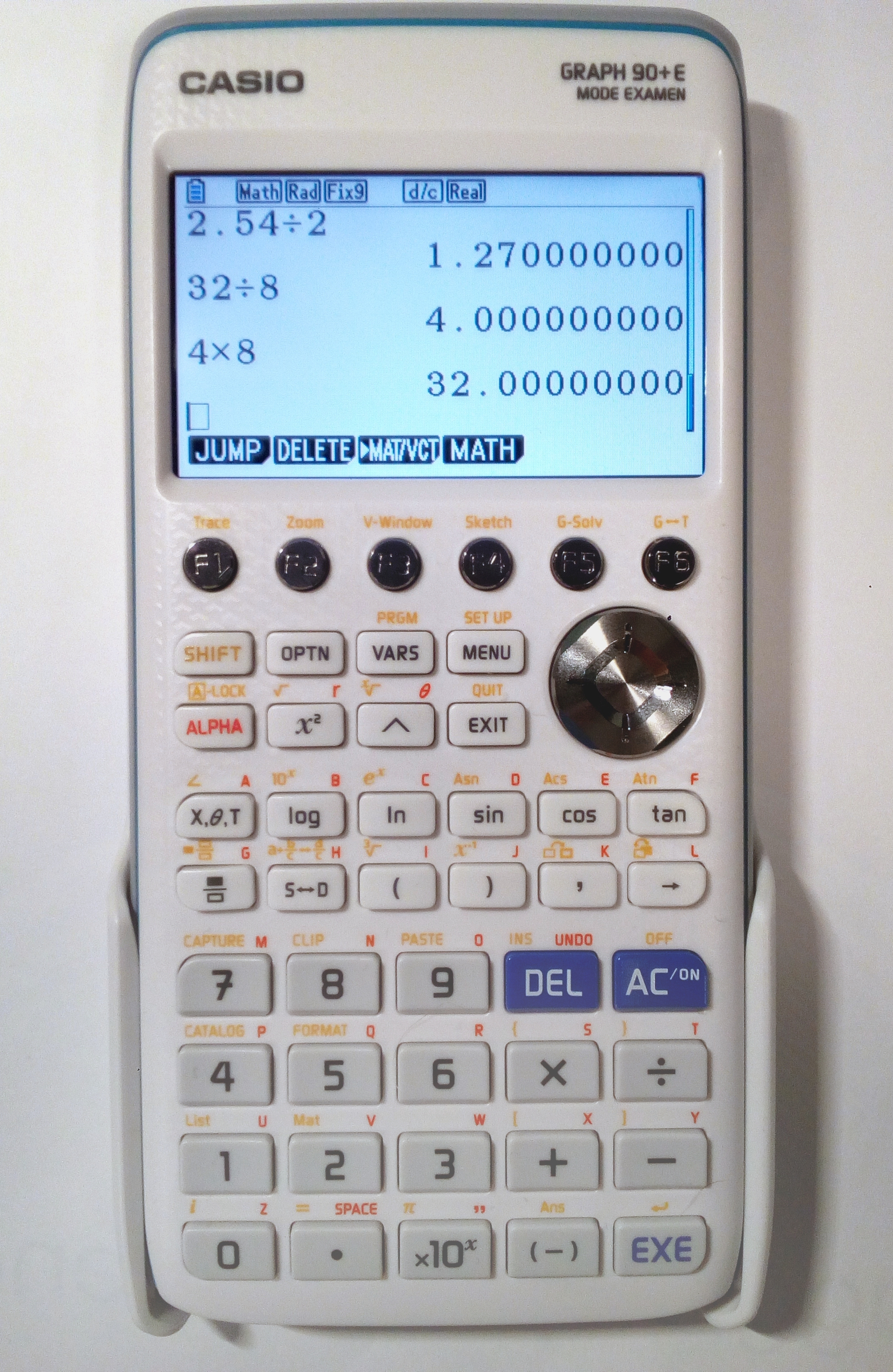
- Casio Graph 90+E
- Type: Programmable Graphing
- Introduced: 2011

Calculator
- Entry mode: Natural-VPAM
- Display type: Color LCD
- Display size: 216x384 pixels

Programming
- Programming language(s): Casio BASIC; MicroPython (Casio fx-CG50 onwards); C; Lua

Other
- Power supply: four AAA alkaline batteries

Casio PRIZM or PRIZM Color Grapher is a series of programmable graphing calculators (succeeded by Casio ClassWiz CG) introduced by Casio in 2011, notable for their high-resolution backlit color display, photo graphing capabilities, and "textbook" mathematics rendering and entry. They are permitted on all major standardized tests including ACT, SAT, AP, GCSE and A-level examinations.

== History ==
The Casio PRIZM series of graphing calculators was announced in 2010 for release in 2011 with the North American "PRIZM fx-CG10" and "PRIZM fx-CG20" variants, simply referred to as the "Casio PRIZM".

Although Casio had released other models with a color display as early as 1996, the PRIZM represented Casio's first full-color model. Together, the fx-CG10 and fx-CG20 were the world's first "full color" graphing calculators (the earlier models only capable of displaying a handful of colors).

Featuring a faster interface, an expanded feature set, and a cosmetic redesign, Casio's fx-CG50 was released in 2017 as the last of the PRIZM lineup.

=== Transition from PRIZM to Classwiz CG ===
In 2024, at the National Council of Teachers of Mathematics (NCTM) Annual Meeting, Casio announced the "fx-CG100 ClassWiz CG"—successor to the PRIZM fx-CG50. While previous "Color Graphing" models bore the PRIZM name, the fx-CG100 is the first in the CG lineup dubbed "ClassWiz". The label was established for some of Casio's more recent calculators, characterized by a redesigned user interface and design language.

Setting the fx-CG100 apart from other ClassWiz models, which lack the color graphing capability that has defined the CG series, the fx-CG100 carries the distinct "ClassWiz CG" label, effectively replacing PRIZM as the marker of Casio's premier color graphing lineup.

=== Industry adoption of color displays ===
Though first to market, Casio only narrowly preceded Texas Instruments in the release of their first color graphing calculator—the TI-Nspire CX, also released in 2011. HP followed suit with the HP Prime in 2013. In 2015, TI followed with the TI-84+ CE, part of the TI-83+/TI-84+ lineup that has dominated US classrooms, bringing color display technology to the most popular graphing calculator series in the country.

== Specifications ==
=== Display and power ===
Unlike contemporary models from other manufacturers which typically feature an internal rechargeable battery, CG models are powered by 4 AAA batteries, supporting either alkaline or NiMH chemistries. The setting for battery choice is configurable on first boot to allow the device to properly estimate battery life.

The display on the fx-CG50 is "brighter, crisper" and possesses "truer colors" compared to those of the fx-CG10 and fx-CG20, but all displays in the CG lineup have the same resolution of 216x384 pixels, on a backlit color LCD.

=== CPU and memory ===
The CG lineup is powered by SH-4 CPUs, clocked at 58MHz. Though built on the same processor, the fx-CG50 and fx-CG100 both run at a higher frequency.

== Programming ==
All Casio CG models support high-level programming, both interpreted on-device and compiled externally, though language support varies.

Casio BASIC is supported by all models, with the exception of the fx-CG100.

The latest models in the series, starting with the fx-CG50, support MicroPython, including the ability to create and edit programs on-device.

Though Casio has in the past released a C SDK for the fx-9860G series of graphing calculators, there is no official support for C on the CG series. Instead, community supported SDKs allow for the development of third-party applications in C. A first for the series, Casio has taken steps with the fx-CG100 to restrict the sideloading of third-party applications, though workarounds have been implemented that work at least on OS version 2. Continued feasibility of this workaround is not guaranteed.

Lua is supported on PRIZM devices via the community LuaZM project, though CG100 support has not been confirmed.
