= Casio 9860 series =

Series of graphing calculators by Casio

The Casio fx-9860G is a series of graphing calculators manufactured by Casio, successor of the fx-9750G PLUS/CFX-9850 PLUS/CFX-9950 PLUS/CFX-9970 family of calculators. All of them are capable of being programmed by means of sophisticated languages and tools including assembly language, Basic variants, and ports of programming languages such as C, as well as hosting add-ins which are compiled on a computer and then downloaded to the calculator.

== fx-9860G, fx-9860G SD ==
CASIO fx-9860G
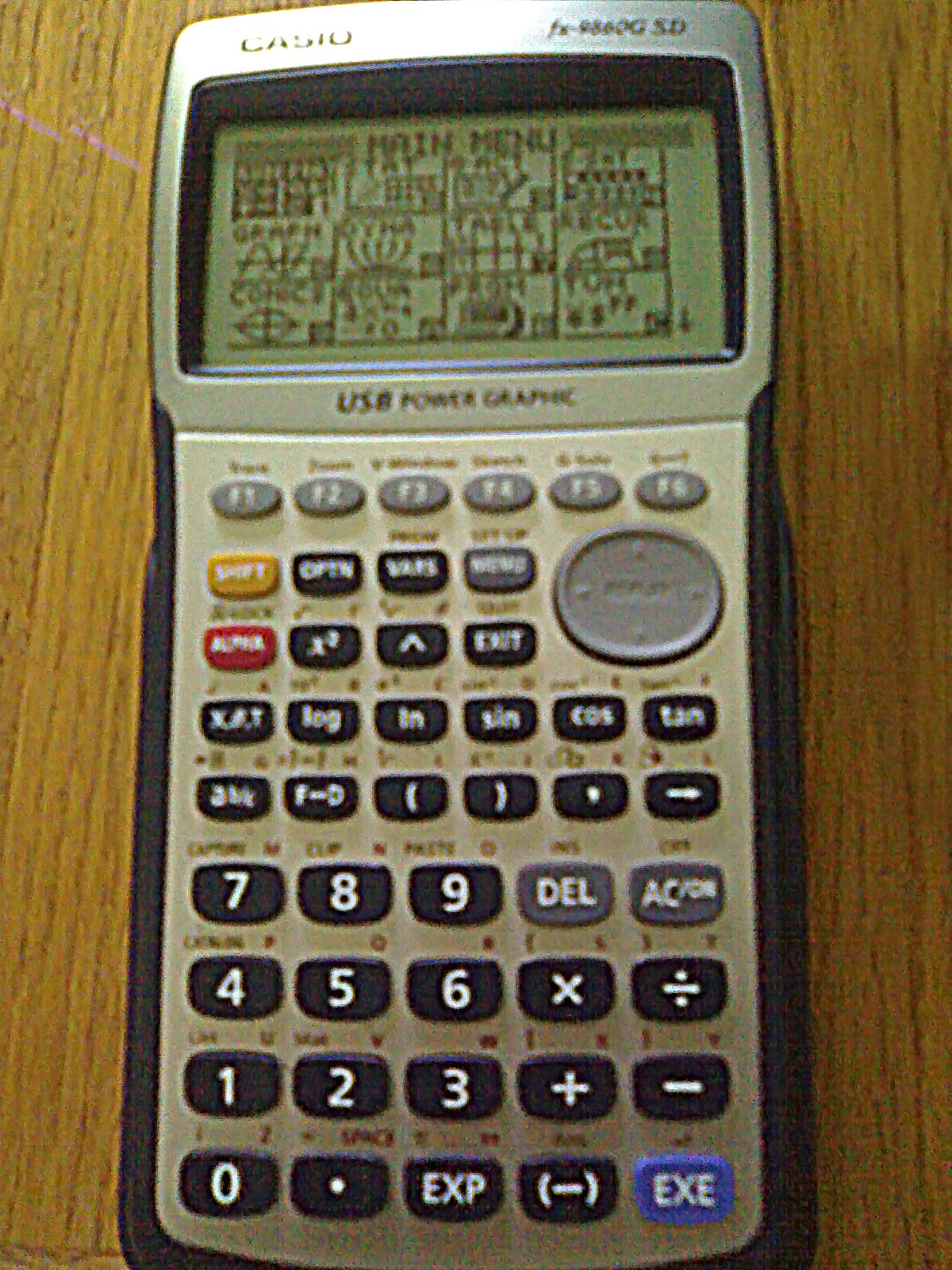
- Casio fx-9860G SD
- Type: Programmable Graphing
- Manufacturer: Casio
- Introduced: 2005

Calculator
- Entry mode: Infix, Mathematical
- Display type: LCD Dot matrix monochrome
- Display size: 128 x 64 pixels

CPU
- Frequency: 29 MHz

Programming
- User memory: 64 KB
- Firmware memory: Flash memory, 1.5 MB (800 KB for AU version)
- External memory: Up to 2 GB for SD version with an SD memory card

Interfaces
- Connects to: PC via one of: USB; serial Ire Casio manufactured graphing calculators. Some of the improvements compared to older models are: Natural Display, a USB port, flash memory, upgradeable OS (through ROM updates) and a high contrast display LCD.

Changes from fx-9750G PLUS, CFX-9850 PLUS, CFX-9950 PLUS, CFX-9970 series include:

- Increase program capacity to 63,000 bytes and storage memory capacity to 1.5 MB.
- The Casio Basic variant on these calculators is a more comprehensive version: string functions, additional control and branching statements
- Addition of USB 1.1 port.
- New modes include spreadsheet, eActivity.
- For models with SD suffix, support of Secure Digital memory cards.

There are several versions of the fx-9860G; the standard fx-9860G, often referred to as the 'vanilla' flavor, and the SD, AU and Slim versions.

- The AU version used to limit the amount of internal flash memory available to 800 Kb to meet Australian school regulations, although it has now been upgraded to 1.5 MB.
- The SD variant comes with an SD expansion card slot, allowing read and write access up to 2 GB of memory on a SD memory card.
- The Slim version has a back-lit display, on-board help, and is designed as a clam-shell to minimize its size.

The usual fx-9860G and fx-9860G SD are marketed in France as Graph85 and Graph85 SD.

=== Programming ===
The calculators can be programmed in different ways. The fx-9860G's come with a built-in BASIC-like interpreter (Casio BASIC), allowing the user to create simple and complex programs using built-in functionality.

The other method is to create an add-in. Add-ins are binary programs, executing directly on the calculator's CPU. Casio has released two official add-ins, GEOMETRY and PHYSIUM. An SDK was released by Casio in 22/01/2007, allowing users to create their own add-ins, though no support is provided for this by Casio. The add-ins and the SDK are available for registered users at Casio's website.

=== Connectivity, and Program Development ===
The calculator supports connecting to computer via USB cable. USB connectivity requires installation of USB driver and Program Link software (FA-124) from the bundled CD-ROM.

The 3-pin COM (serial) port supports transferring data between other CFX-9850/fx-7400 series calculator up to 9600 bit/s, and other fx-9860G series calculator up to 115,200 bit/s.

== fx-9860GII, fx-9860GII SD ==
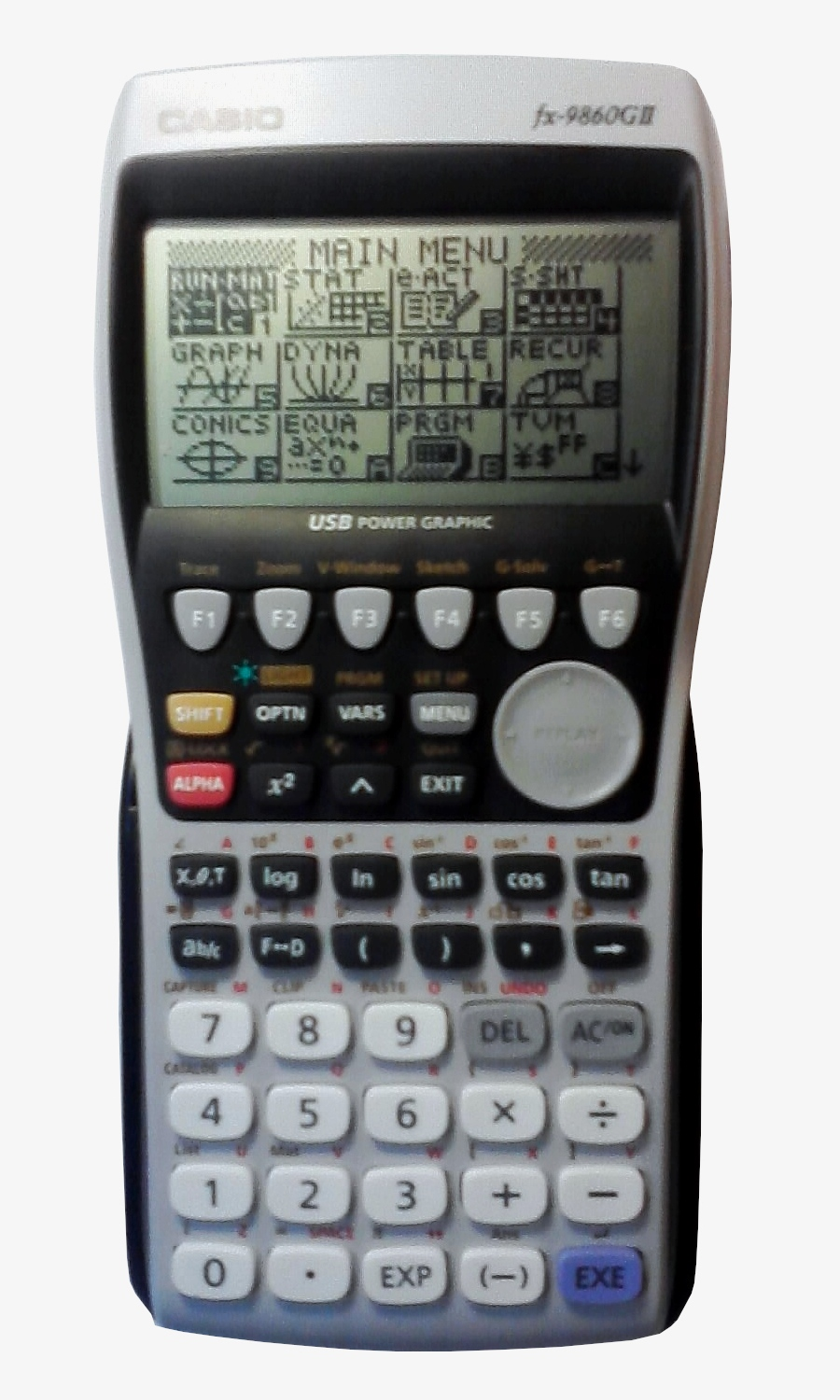
Casio fx-9860GII

The fx-9860GII and fx-9860GII SD became available in May 2009. These calculators have backlit displays and the Geometry (in user mem) and ECON2 add-ins preinstalled. They also have new mathematical functions.

The French versions of the GII models are the Graph 75 and Graph 95. The Australian version of the GII is the fx-9860G AU PLUS.

== fx-9860GIII ==
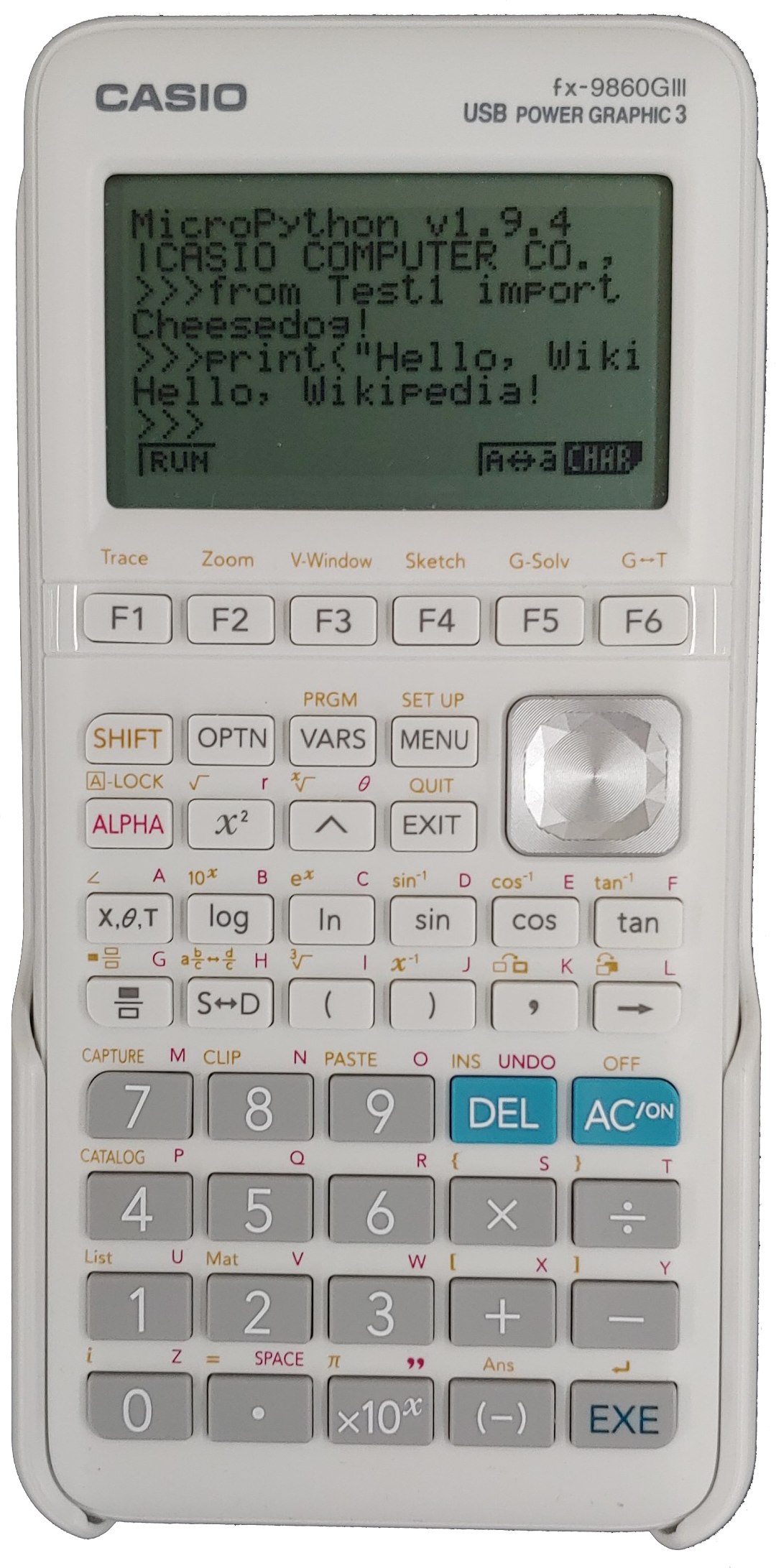
Casio fx-9860GIII

The fx-9860GIII became available in 2020. It has an updated design, but the screen is no longer backlit and has smaller dimensions, though displays the same number of pixels. It comes with Geometry and ECON3 add-ins, and built-in MicroPython.
