= Casio fx-7000G =

Graphing calculator by Casio

FX-7000G/FX-7000GA
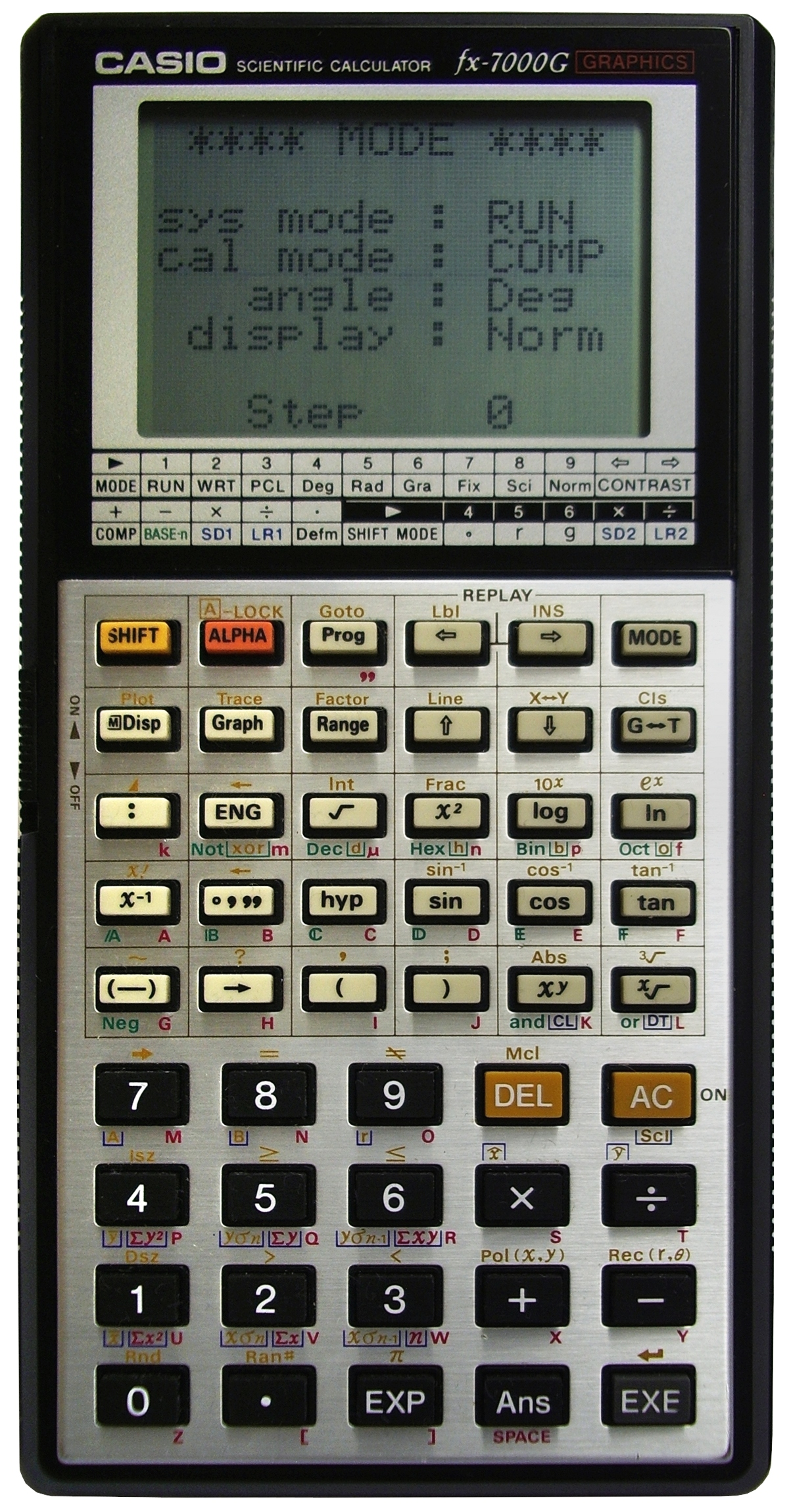
- Introduced: 1985
- Discontinued: 1989

Calculator
- Entry mode: Infix
- Precision: 13 digits
- Display type: LCD Dot matrix
- Display size: 96 × 64 pixels/8 * 16 characters

Programming
- Memory register: 26 numbers 78 numbers (maximum)
- Program steps: 422 bytes

Other
- Power supply: 3 × CR2032 Lithium
- Dimensions: 165 mm × 89 mm × 15 mm (6.5 in × 3.5 in × 0.6 in)

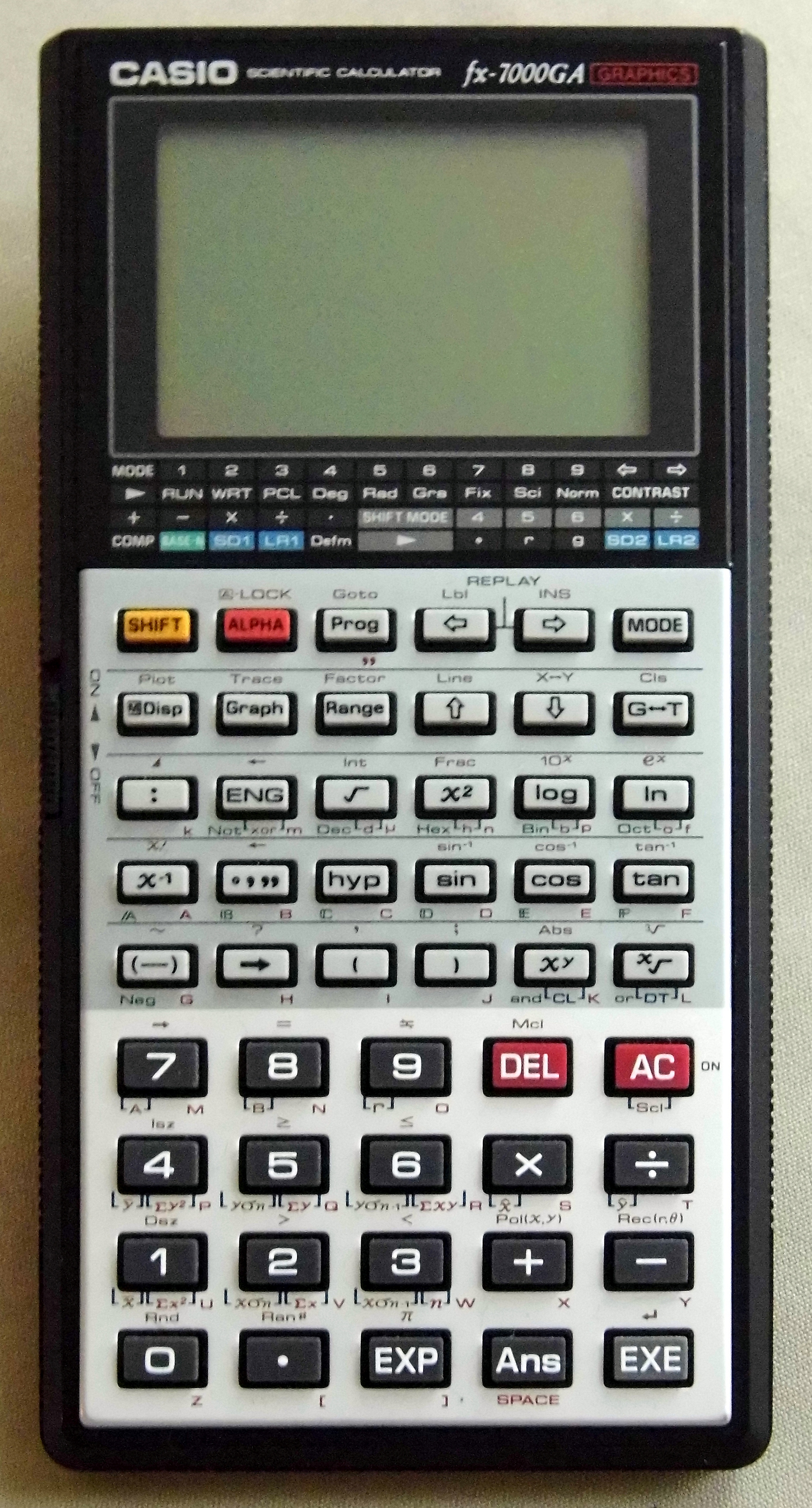
The successor FX-7000 GA was released in 1990.

The Casio FX-7000G is a calculator which is widely known as being the world's first graphing calculator available to the public. It was introduced to the public and later manufactured between 1985 and c. 1989. Notable features are its ability to graph functions, and that it is programmable. The calculator offers 82 scientific functions and is capable of manual computation for basic arithmetic problems.

== Features ==
=== Mathematical ===
The calculator can compute basic arithmetic functions with a precision up to 13 digits. Many functions integrated into the calculator include arithmetic and algebraic computations such as:

- square roots
- reciprocals
- exponential functions
- factorials
- logarithms
- trig functions

Other specialized functions also implemented into the calculator include hyperbolic and statistical functions, binary/octal/hexadecimal/sexagesimal conversions and graph plotting.

=== Programming ===
Like many Casio calculators, the FX-7000G includes a programming mode, in addition to its display and graphing mode. It holds 422 bytes of programming memory, less than half a kilobyte. The calculator uses a tokenized programming language (similar to the earlier FX-602P) which is well suited to writing more complex programs, as memory efficiency is a priority. Tokenization is performed by using characters and symbols in place of long lines of code to minimize the amount of memory being used. The User Manual programming catalog is written in these symbols, allowing for lengthier programs to be written with less effort and less memory. One example is a program which estimates a definite integral through the use of Simpson's Rule; this can be found within the user manual for reference.

The calculator has 26 numeric memories as standard. Additional memories can be created by reducing the number of bytes available for programs. Using this facility allows a total of 78 memories maximum.

=== Graphing ===
The calculator has a built in graphing feature which is unique to its model. The calculator can display either built-in graphs that are already programmed or display a user defined graph. The user also has the option to rewrite any of the previously programmed graphs.
Statistical graphs can also be generated: bar graphs, line graphs, normal distribution curves, regression lines.

== Display and exterior ==
=== Display ===
The FX-7000G incorporates an LCD Dot Matrix design via the display window. When set into character mode the calculator can display up to sixteen characters on each of its eight display lines. This sixteen character by eight line display is screened on the 96 × 64 dot matrix. The LCD is not capable of colour or grey scale display.

=== Exterior ===
A black casing surrounds the calculator along with a metal panel implemented on the rear; a large plastic screen protects the LCD window as well. Keys are labeled and printed on orange, green, blue, red, and black malleable buttons.

=== Measurements ===
The calculator's dimensions (width, height, depth) are 83.5 mm × 167 mm × 14 mm (3.29 in × 6.57 in × 0.55 in). It has an approximate mass of 155.5 g (5.49 oz) including batteries.

=== Power ===
The Casio Fx-7000G needs a 9.0 volt DC current lithium battery supply provided by 3 CR2032 type cells. The calculator does not accept an AC adapter and only uses batteries. The average battery life is around 120 hours which is shorter in length compared to similar models.

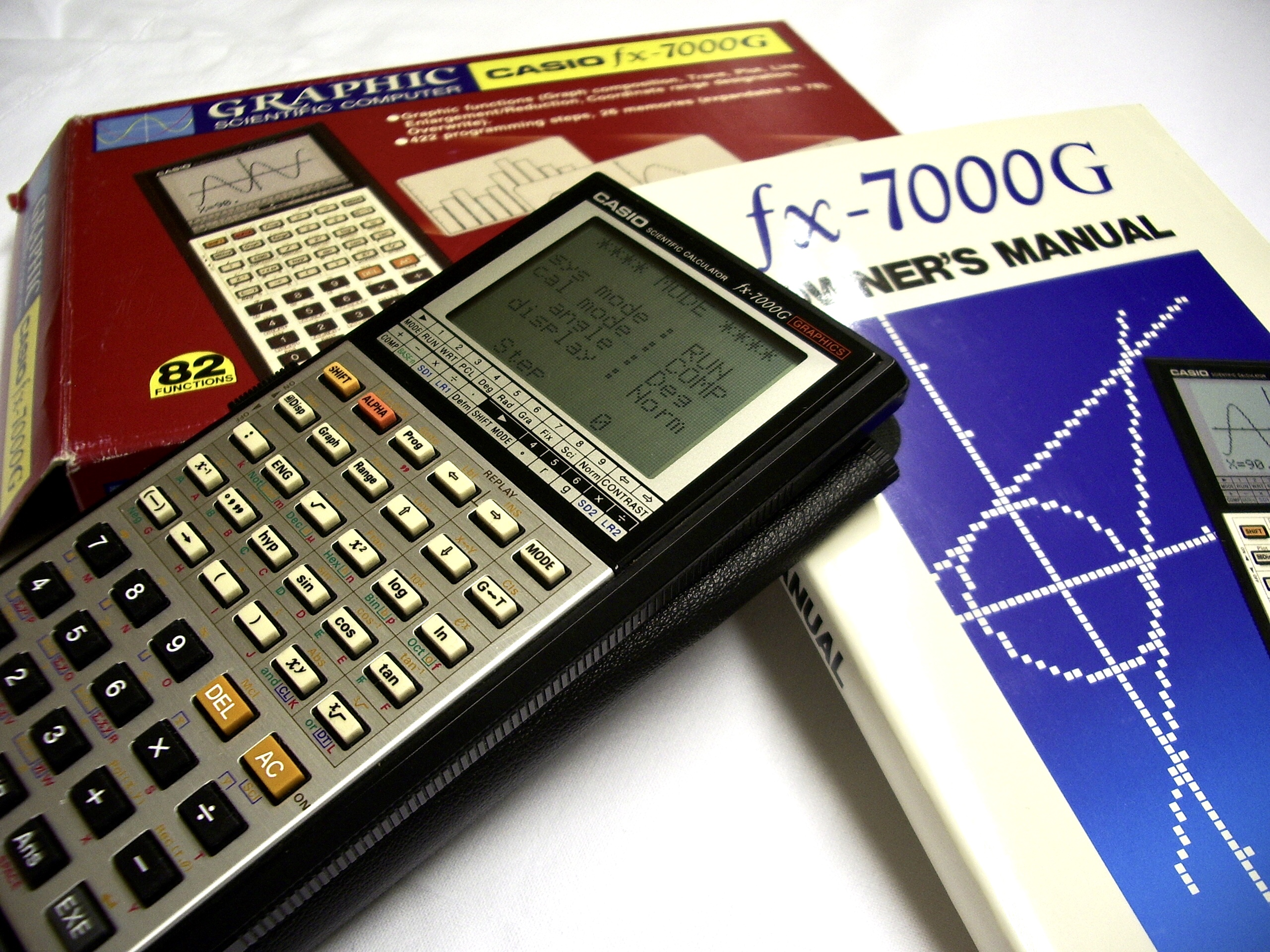
The calculator with box and operation manual

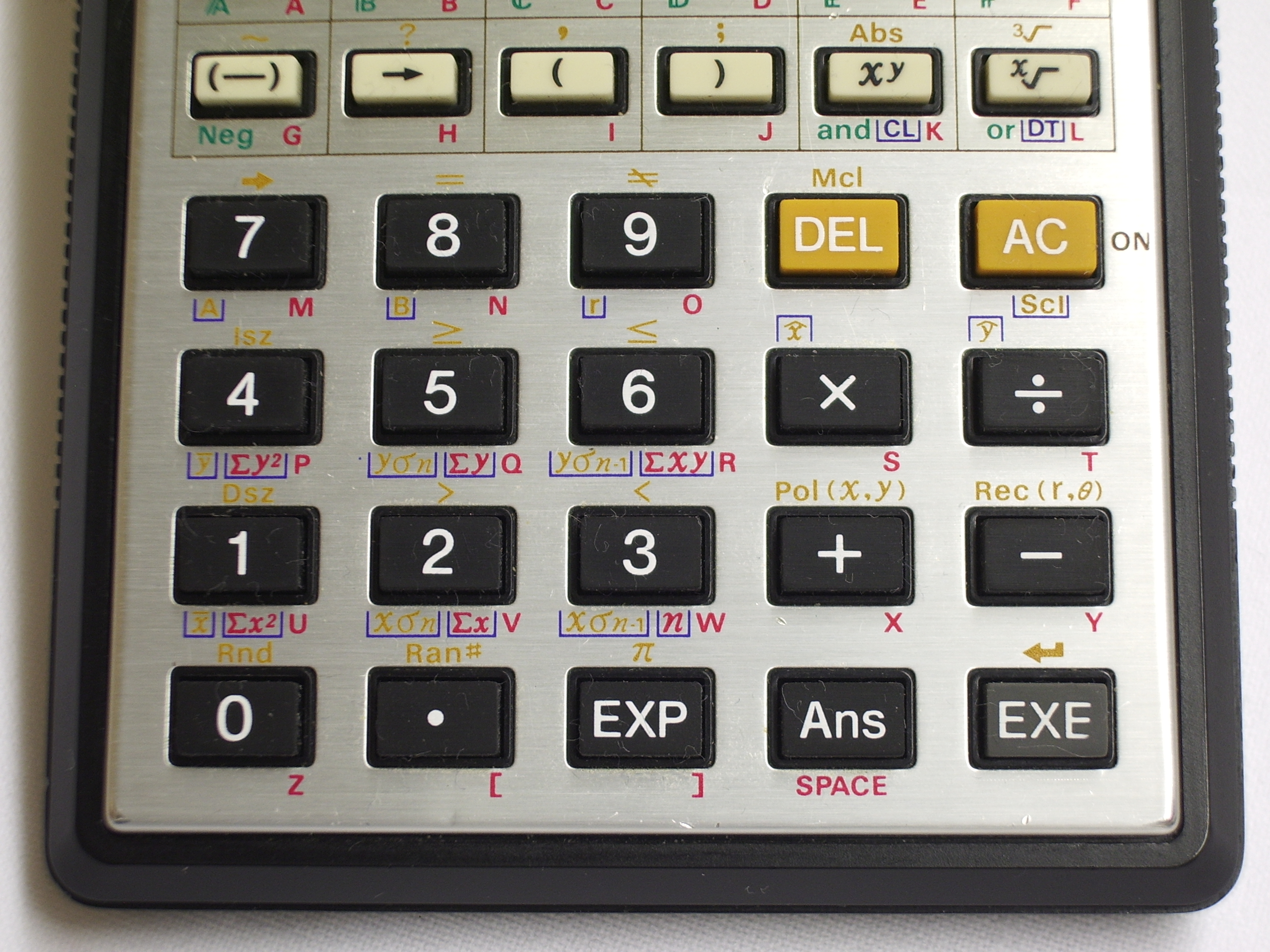
The lower keys have the traditional Casio layout. The EXE key would execute the sum on the keyboard. The Ans key could be used to represent the last answer; simple iterative functions could be built up.

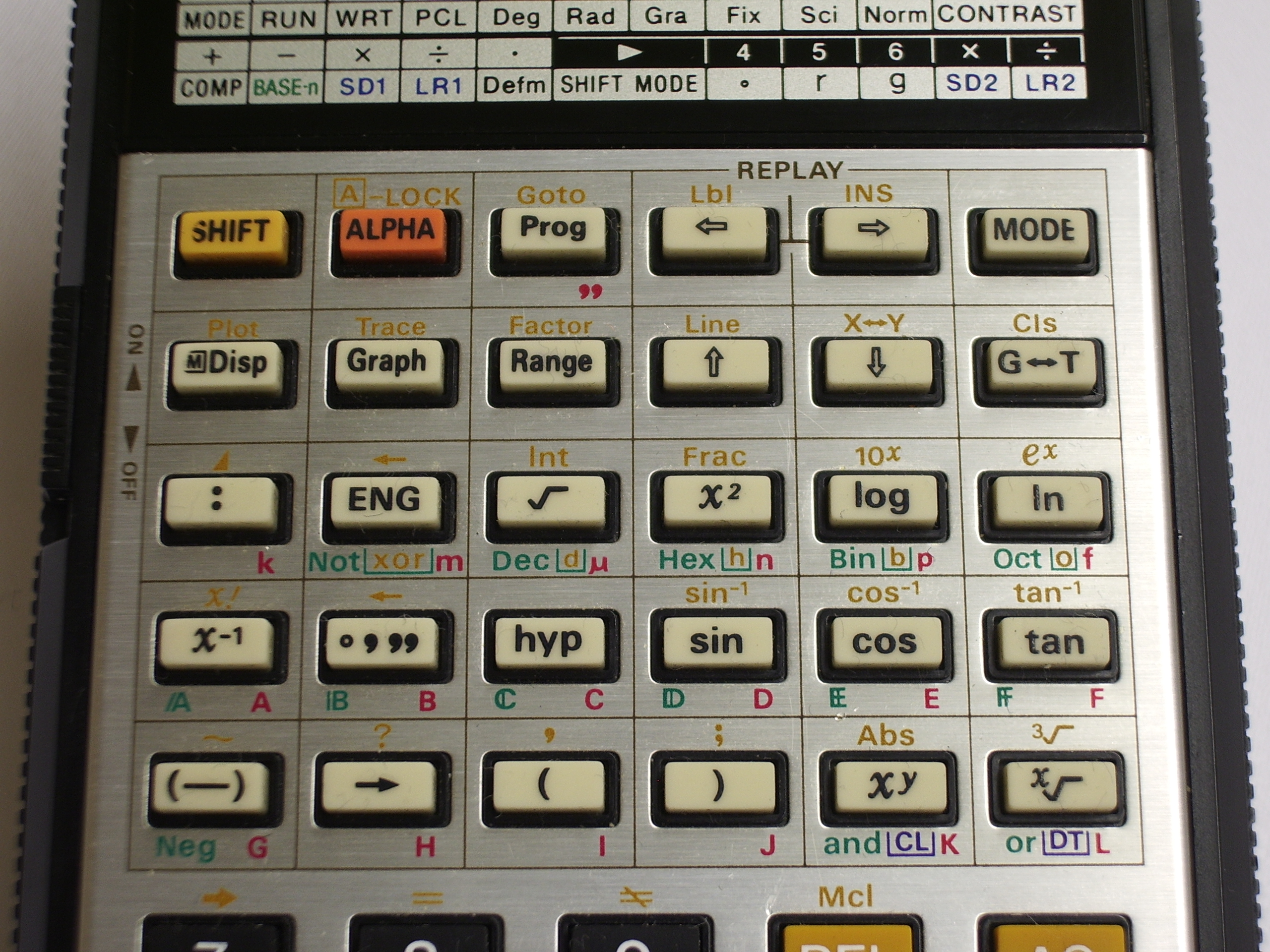
The upper keyboard has the main function keys. The SHIFT and ALPHA keys are used to access the many different functions each key could be.

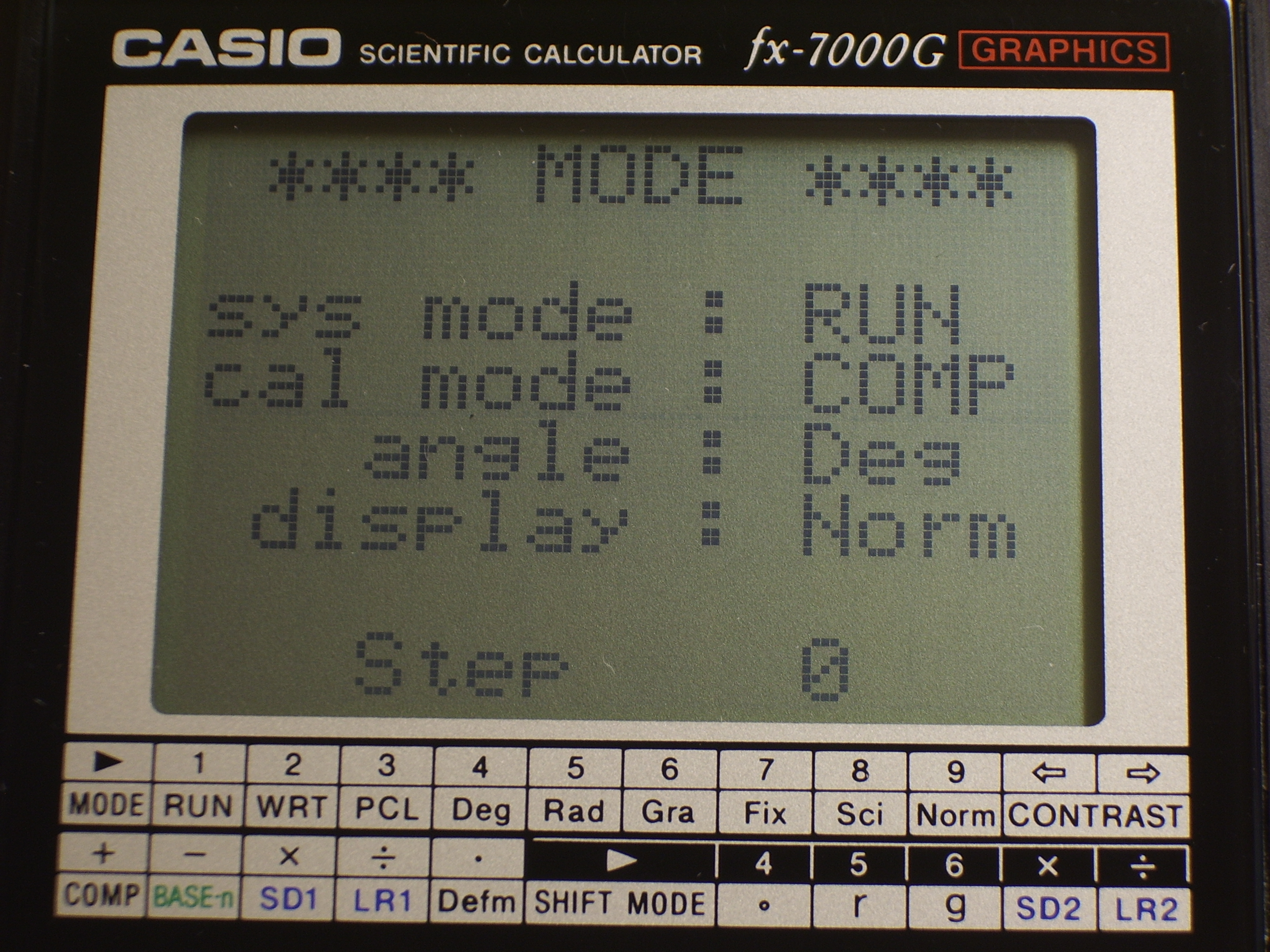
The power-on screen displays system mode, calculation mode, angle unit and rounding. These could be changed by pressing the MODE button, or SHIFT then MODE buttons, as shown on the writing below the screen.

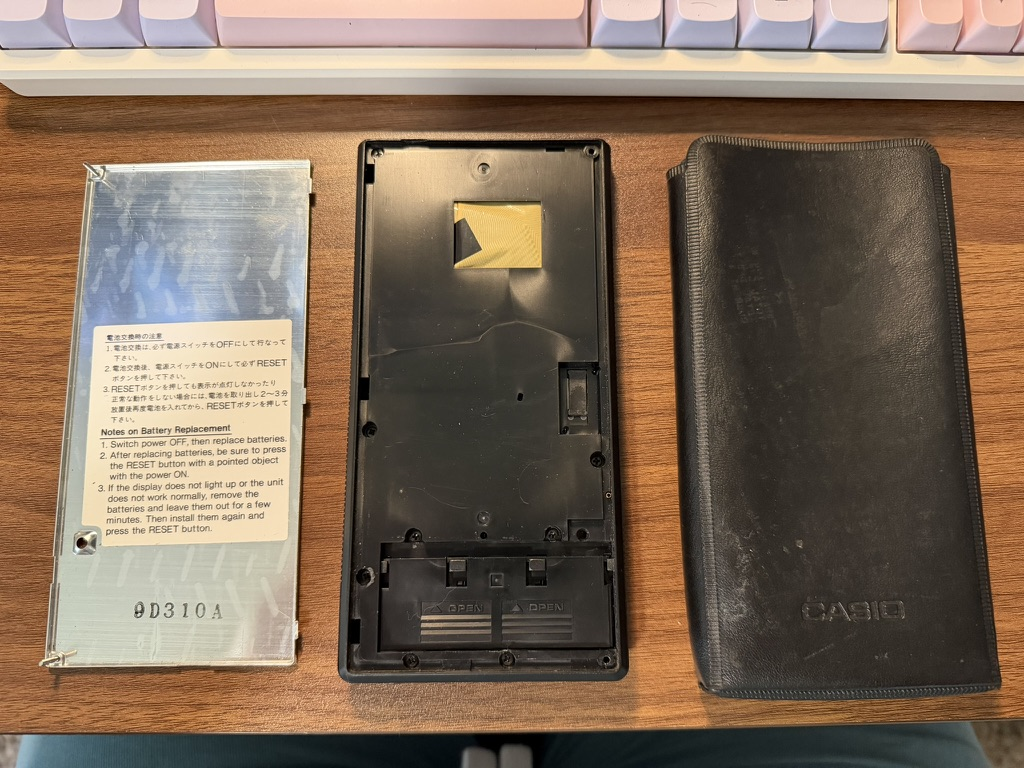
This 7000g is date-coded 1989 and is from very late production. Date code 9D310A represents 1989, April, 31st, factory data code 0A.

== See also ==
- Casio graphic calculators
