= Casio BASIC =

Casio calculator programming language

- Paradigm: Procedural
- Developer: Casio
- Typing discipline: Static
- OS: none
- Website: www.casio.com

Casio BASIC (or BasicLike in some models) is a programming language used in the Casio calculators, such as the ClassPad, PRIZM Series, fx-9750G series, fx-9860G Series, fx-5800P, Algebra FX and CFX graphing calculators.

Casio BASIC is not the same as the more or less standard BASIC, which incorporated from the beginning of the ’80s, the so-called "Pocket computers" or "Pocket PC" from Casio, among which the FX series can be found. -702P, Series 100 (PB-100), Series 700 (PB-100), and many others. The version of BASIC of these machines is called Casio POCKETPC BASIC.

The language is a linear structured, BASIC-based programming language. It was devised to allow users to program in commonly performed calculations, such as the Pythagorean theorem and complex trigonometric calculations.

Output from the program can be in the form of scrolling or located text, graphs, or by writing data to lists and matrices in the calculator memory. Casio also makes label printers which can be used with rolls of paper for the Casio BASIC calculators. Programs, variables, data, and other items can be exchanged from one calculator to another (via SB-62 cable) and to and from a computer (via USB cable). All new models of Casio graphing calculators have both ports and include both cables.

The Casio calculators, like other big three manufacturers’ machines, can acquire data from instruments via a data logger or data acquisition unit. Probes for temperature, light intensity, pH, sound intensity (dBA), voltage and others attach to the data logger. Home-made and Do-it-yourself (DIY) data acquisition units and sensors can be built and configured for use with Casio calculators. Data can be collected from weather instruments and other sensors to record heart rate, blood pressure, galvanic skin resistance, EKG and so on.

Like Tiny BASIC, the BASIC interpreter for Casio BASIC restricts variable names to the letters A-Z with just one predefined array (in Casio BASIC, Z, as compared to A in Level I BASIC and @ in Palo Alto Tiny BASIC). For Casio's graphical calculators, italic x, y, r and θ are also used as variable names for certain calculations. Therefore, extending the array size of predefined variable names from 26 to 30.

Numerical data can be stored in the lists and matrices available on Casio calculators. This data can be used to create sprites for non-text programs. In this way, the language can also be used to create games, such as Pong, Monopoly and role-playing games.

Additionally, characters can be stored as strings in the string memory.

== Examples ==
"Hello, World!" program in Casio BASIC:

"Hello, world!"

Or by using the Print command:

Print "Hello World"

Program to calculate the Fibonacci sequence:

"Generate # of Fibonacci Sequence…"
?→N
N≤0⇒Stop
0→A
1→B

For 1→J To N Step 1
A◢
A+B→C
B→A
C→B
Next

Program to calculate the Pythagorean theorem:

ClrText
Print "1) SOLVE C"
Print "2) SOLVE A OR B"
Input X, "CHOOSE 1) OR 2)"

If X=1
Then 
Input A, "INPUT A:"
Input B, "INPUT B:"
Print √(A^2+B^2)
IfEnd

If X=2
Then
Input C, "INPUT C:"
Input A, "KNOWN (A OR B)"
Print √(C^2-A^2)
IfEnd

== See also ==
- TI-BASIC
- BASIC
