= Graphing calculator =

Electronic calculator capable of plotting graphs

A graphing calculator (also graphics calculator or graphic display calculator) is a handheld computer that is capable of plotting graphs, solving simultaneous equations, and performing other tasks with variables. Most popular graphing calculators are programmable calculators, allowing the user to create customized programs, typically for scientific, engineering or education applications. They have large screens that display several lines of text and calculations.

== History ==
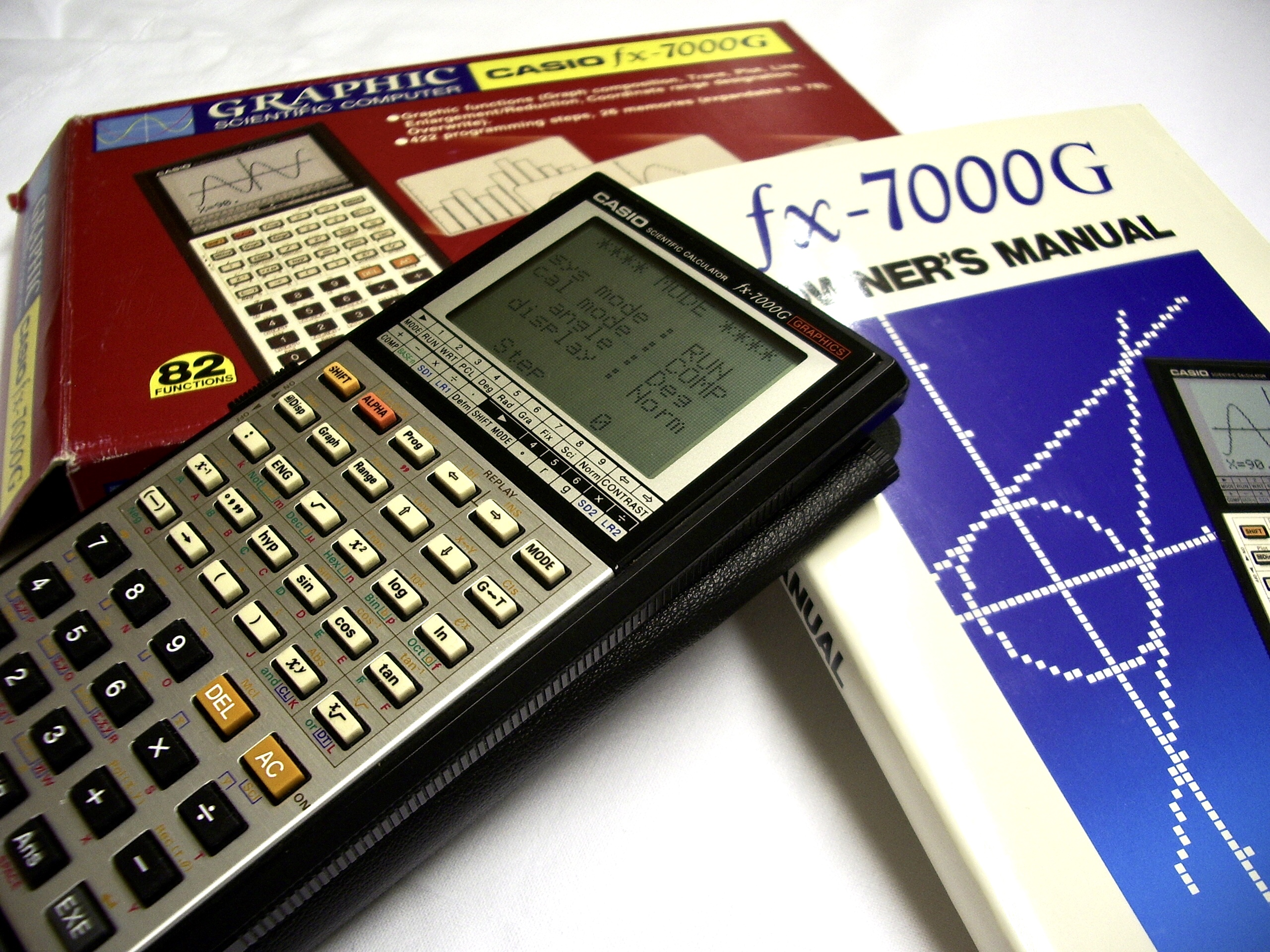
Casio fx-7000G; the world's first graphing calculator

An early graphing calculator was designed in 1921 by electrical engineer Edith Clarke. The calculator was used to solve problems with electrical power line transmission.

Casio produced the first commercially available graphing calculator (fx-7000G) in 1985. Sharp produced its first graphing calculator in 1986, with Hewlett Packard following in 1988, and Texas Instruments in 1990.

== Features ==
=== Computer algebra systems ===
The Texas Instruments TI-89 Titanium graphing a sine type graph. (Generated from TI ScreenCapture software on TI Connect CE.)

Some graphing calculators have a computer algebra system (CAS), which means that they are capable of producing symbolic results. These calculators can manipulate algebraic expressions, performing operations such as factor, expand, and simplify. In addition, they can give answers in exact form without numerical approximations. Calculators that have a computer algebra system are called symbolic or CAS calculators.

=== Laboratory usage ===
Many graphing calculators can be attached to devices like electronic thermometers, pH gauges, weather instruments, decibel and light meters, accelerometers, and other sensors and therefore function as data loggers, as well as WiFi or other communication modules for monitoring, polling and interaction with the teacher. Student laboratory exercises with data from such devices enhances learning of math, especially statistics and mechanics.

=== Games and utilities ===
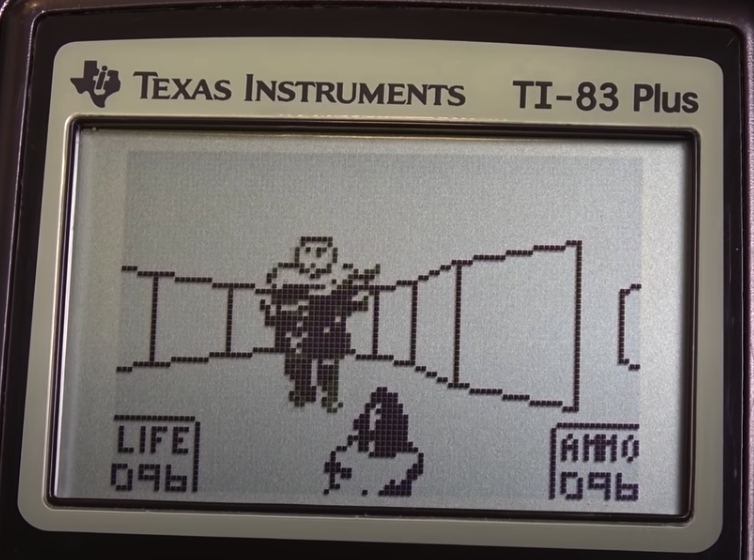
Graphing calculators are sometimes used for gaming.

Since graphing calculators are typically user-programmable, they are also widely used for utilities and calculator gaming, with a sizable body of user-created game software on most popular platforms. The ability to create games and utilities has spurred the creation of calculator application sites (e.g., Cemetech) which, in some cases, may offer programs created using calculators' assembly language. Even though handheld gaming devices fall in a similar price range, graphing calculators offer superior math programming capability for math based games. However, due to poor display resolution, slow processor speed and lack of a dedicated keyboard, they are mostly preferred only by high school students.

While many calculators support third-party software development, there are some modifications discouraged or challenged by manufacturers, particularly modifications that add unauthorized functionality or circumvent security protections. In 2009, Texas Instruments issued DMCA takedown notices to websites and bloggers sharing cryptographic keys to their devices that enabled the installation of custom firmware. In 2020, Texas Instruments removed assembly and C programming support for the TI-84 Plus CE operating system. According to Inverse, the company stated that they removed such functionality "to prioritize learning and minimize security risks".

== Software graphing calculators ==
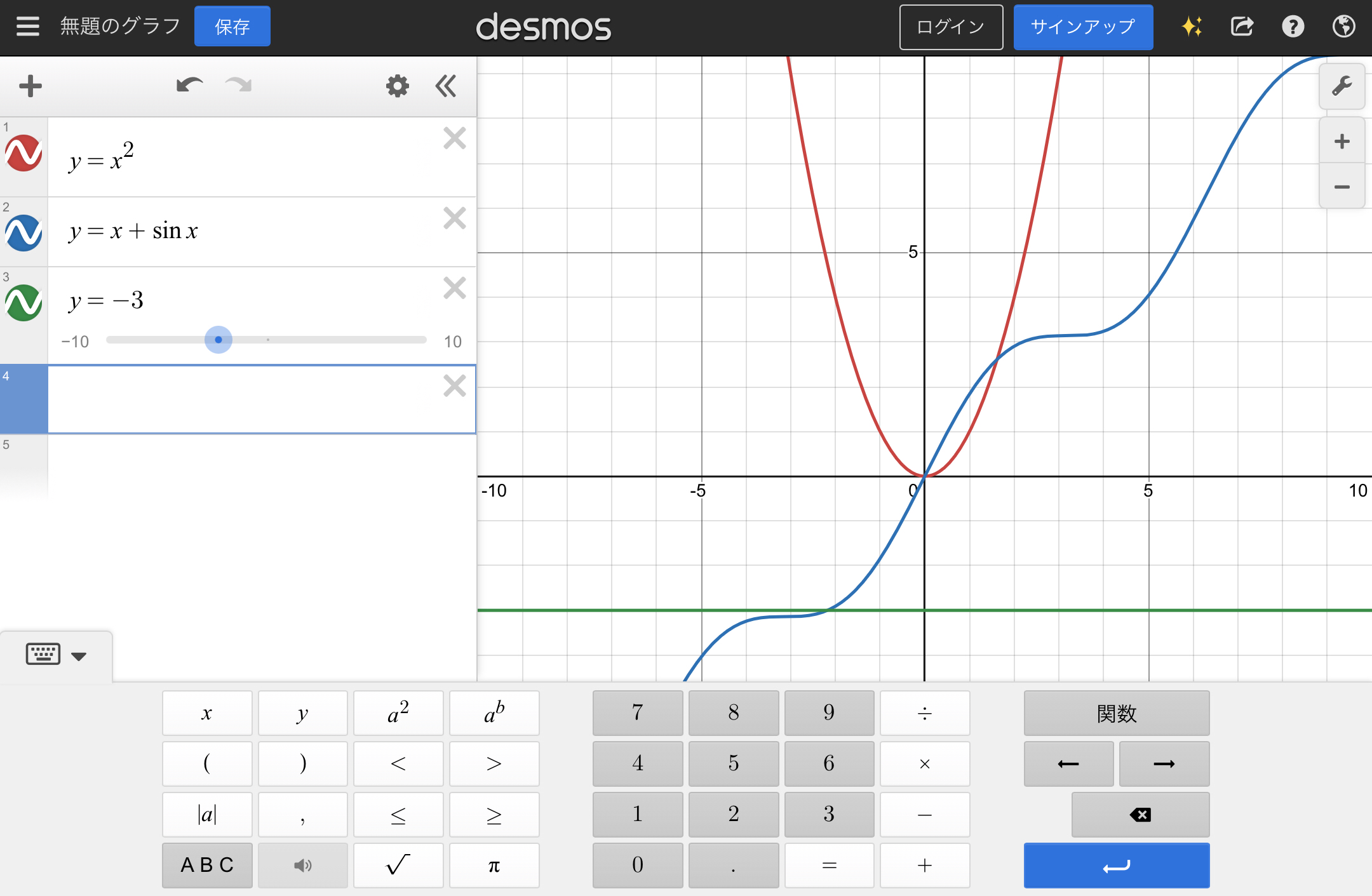
The Desmos graphing calculator in use

There are many graphing calculators that do not require dedicated hardware, but run on a device in a web browser or as an app. Notable graphing calculators of this type include Desmos and GeoGebra. Software calculators generally fall within two categories: native software tools and emulators of physical calculator models, such as the virtual TI-84 Plus CE and fx-cg50.

Software graphing calculators run on general devices such as smartphones and personal computers. Interfaces often work with keyboard input and/or virtual buttons. Graphing calculator programs often allow for interactive or dynamic graphing and some like Desmos and GeoGebra are regularly updated to add features or fix bugs.

== Graphing calculators in education ==
Attitudes towards graphing and other calculators in education have evolved over the years, and while some jurisdictions prohibit their use for classwork or exams, others permit or even require their usage, particularly for calculus and trigonometry classes.

In 2022 Amplify bought Desmos Education / Curriculum.

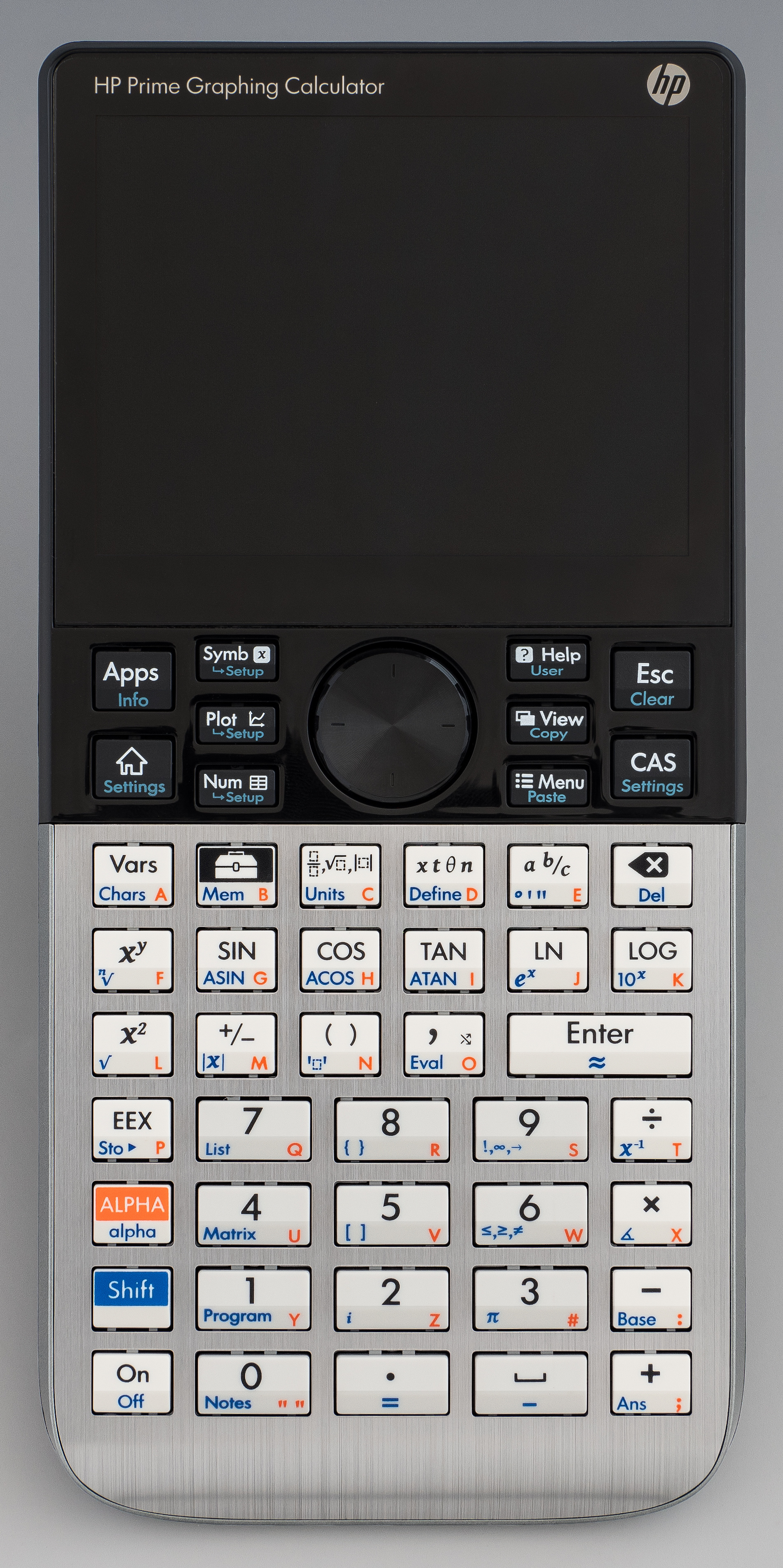
HP Prime, a modern graphing calculator capable of doing Symbolic Manipulation, Computer Algebra System (CAS)

- North America – high school mathematics teachers allow and even encourage their students to use graphing calculators in class. In some cases (especially in calculus courses) they are required.
- College Board of the United States – permits the use of most graphing calculators that do not have a QWERTY-style keyboard for parts of its AP and SAT exams. CAS-equipped calculators are permitted on AP exams, however they are not permitted on the SAT exams. The ACT exam and IB schools do not permit the use of calculators with computer algebra systems.
- United Kingdom – a graphing calculator is allowed for A-level maths courses, however they are not required and the exams are designed to be broadly 'calculator neutral'. Similarly, at GCSE, all current courses include one paper where no calculator of any kind can be used, but students are permitted to use graphical calculators for other papers. The use of graphical calculators at GCSE is not widespread with cost being a likely factor. The use of CAS is not allowed for either A-level or GCSE. Similarly, calculators with QWERTY keyboard layout are also not allowed as well. The Scottish SQA allows the use of graphic calculators in maths exams (excluding paper 1, which is exclusively non-calculator), however these should either be checked before exams by invigilators or handed out by the exam centre, as certain functions / information is not allowed to be stored on a calculator in the exam.
- Finland and Slovenia – and certain other countries, it is forbidden to use calculators with symbolic calculation (CAS) or 3D graphics features in the matriculation exam. This changed in the case of Finland, however, as symbolic calculators were allowed from spring 2012 onwards.
- Norway – At some technical universities such as NTNU and NHH, only calculators without wireless communication capabilities like IR links are permitted.
- Australia – policies vary from state to state.
  - Victoria – the VCE specifies approved calculators as applicable for its mathematics exams. For Further Mathematics an approved graphics calculator (for example TI-83/84, Casio 9860, HP-39G) or CAS (for example TI-89, the ClassPad series, HP-40G) can be used. Mathematical Methods (CAS) has a technology free examination consisting of short answer and some extended answer questions. It then also has a technology-active examination consisting of extended response and multiple choice questions: a CAS is the assumed technology for Mathematical Methods (CAS). Specialist Mathematics has a technology free examination and a technology-active examination where either an approved graphics calculator or CAS may be used. Calculator memories are not required to be cleared. In subjects like Physics and Chemistry, students are only allowed a standard scientific calculator.
  - Western Australia – all tertiary entrance examinations in Mathematics involve a calculator section which assume the student has a graphics calculator; CAS enabled calculators are also permitted. In subjects such as Physics, Chemistry and Accounting only non-programmable calculators are permitted.
  - New South Wales – graphics calculators are allowed for the General Mathematics Higher School Certificate exam, but disallowed in the higher level Mathematics courses.
- China - Only the Shanghai College Entrance Examination and corresponding high school subjects (Mathematics, Physics, Chemistry, Biology) allow the use of calculators without graphing and memory. Except for Shanghai, the other provinces and cities do not allow the use of calculators, so calculators in general are banned in primary and secondary education in most parts of China.
- India - Calculators are prohibited in primary and secondary education. (ICSE allows the Casio fx-82MS, or equivalent scientific calculator in 12th boards). They are also prohibited in entrance exams held by the National Testing Agency such as the JEE. University degree and diploma courses have their own rules on use of permitted models of calculators in exams. Casio's fx-991MS, fx-991ES, fx-100MS, and fx-350MS scientific calculators are used in many university degree and diploma courses. These calculators are also permitted for university exams as they are non-programmable since programmable calculators are not allowed for university exams. During the online GATE examinations and other competitive examinations, candidates are provided with a virtual scientific calculator as physical calculators of any type are not permitted.
- New Zealand – Calculators identified as having high-level algebraic manipulation capability are prohibited in NCEA examinations unless specifically allowed by a standard or subject prescription. This includes calculators such as the TI-89 series .
- Turkey – any type of calculator whatsoever is prohibited in all primary and high schools.
- Singapore – graphing calculators are used in junior colleges; it is required in the Mathematics paper of the GCE 'A' Levels, and most schools use the TI-84 Plus or TI-84 Plus Silver Edition.
- Netherlands – high school students are obliged to use graphing calculators during tests and exams in their final three years. Most students use the TI-83 Plus or TI-84 Plus, but other graphing calculators are allowed, including the Casio fx-9860G and HP-39G. Graphing calculators are almost always allowed to be used during tests instead of normal calculators, which sometimes results in cheat sheets being made on forehand and exchanged before the test starts using link cables.
- Israel – Graphing calculators are forbidden to use in the Bagrut (equivalent to the British A-Levels) math exam, in addition to programmable calculators. University degree and diploma courses have their own rules on use and permitted models of calculators in exams.

== Programming ==
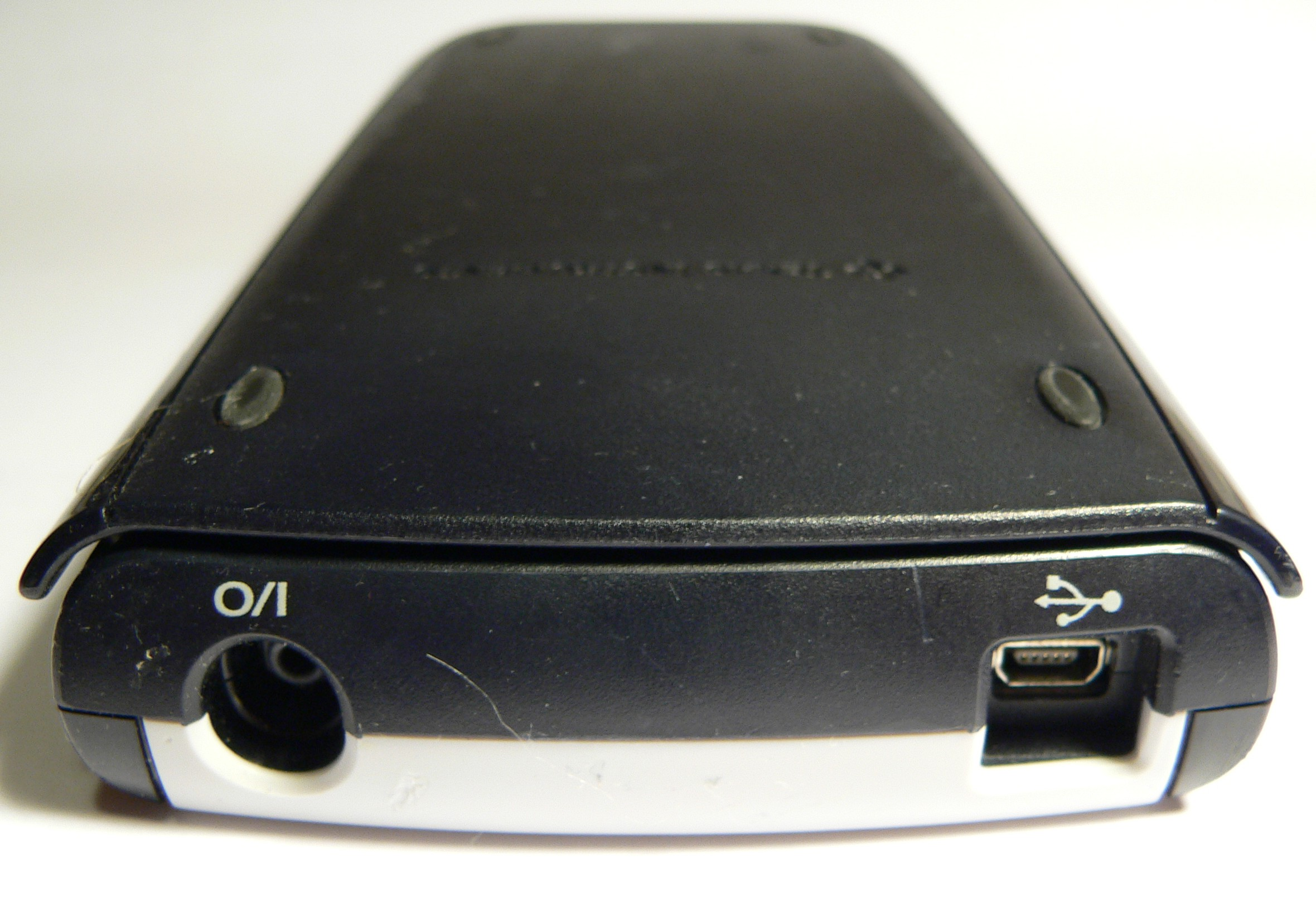
Typical ports on a graphing calculator. These contain a 2.5 mm I/O port for connecting to other calculators and a Mini USB port for connecting to a PC.

Most graphing calculators, as well as some non-graphing scientific calculators and programmer's calculators can be programmed to automate complex and frequently used series of calculations and those inaccessible from the keyboard.

For many graphing calculators, including TI and Casio models, users can write programs on a computer and upload them to the calculator. Common tools for this process include PC link cables and corresponding software for the specific calculator, configurable text editors or hex editors, and specialized programming environments supporting various languages on the computer side.

Earlier calculators used magnetic cards and similar media for program storage; however, increased onboard memory has made internal storage the prevailing method. Some modern calculators also support external memory cards.

A cable and/or IrDA transceiver connecting the calculator to a computer make the process easier and expands other possibilities such as on-board spreadsheet, database, graphics, and word processing programs. The second option is being able to code the programs on board the calculator itself. This option is facilitated by the inclusion of full-screen text editors and other programming tools in the default feature set of the calculator or as optional items. Some calculators have QWERTY keyboards and others can be attached to an external keyboard which can be close to the size of a regular 102-key computer keyboard. Programming is a major use for the software and cables used to connect calculators to computers.

The most common programming languages used for calculators are similar to keystroke-macro languages and variants of BASIC. The latter can have a large feature set—approaching that of BASIC as found in computers—including character and string manipulation, advanced conditional and branching statements, sound, graphics, and more including, of course, the huge spectrum of mathematical, string, bit-manipulation, number base, I/O, and graphics functions built into the machine.

Most calculators capable of being connected to a computer can be programmed in assembly language and machine code, although on some calculators this is only possible through using exploits. The most common assembly and machine languages are for TMS9900, SH-3, Zilog Z80, and various Motorola chips (e.g. a modified 68000) which serve as the main processors of the machines although many (not all) are modified to some extent from their use elsewhere. Some manufacturers do not document and even mildly discourage the assembly language programming of their machines because they must be programmed in this way by putting together the program on the PC and then forcing it into the calculator by various improvised methods.

Other on-board programming languages include purpose-made languages, variants of Eiffel, Forth, and Lisp, and Command Script facilities which are similar in function to batch/shell programming and other glue languages on computers but generally not as full featured.

Some calculators, especially those with other PDA-like functions, have actual operating systems including the TI proprietary OS for its more recent machines, MS-DOS, Windows CE, and rarely Windows NT 4.0 Embedded et seq, and Linux. Experiments with the TI-89, TI-92, TI-92 Plus and Voyage 200 machines show the possibility of installing some variants of other systems such as a chopped-down variant of CP/M-68K, an operating system which has been used for portable devices in the past.

Tools which allow for programming the calculators in C/C++ and possibly Fortran and assembly language are used on the computer side, such as HPGCC, TIGCC and others. Flash memory is another means of conveyance of information to and from the calculator.

Most graphing calculators have on-board spreadsheets which usually integrate with Microsoft Excel on the computer side. At this time, spreadsheets with macro and other automation facilities on the calculator side are not on the market. In some cases, the list, matrix, and data grid facilities can be combined with the native programming language of the calculator to have the effect of a macro and scripting enabled spreadsheet.

== Gallery ==
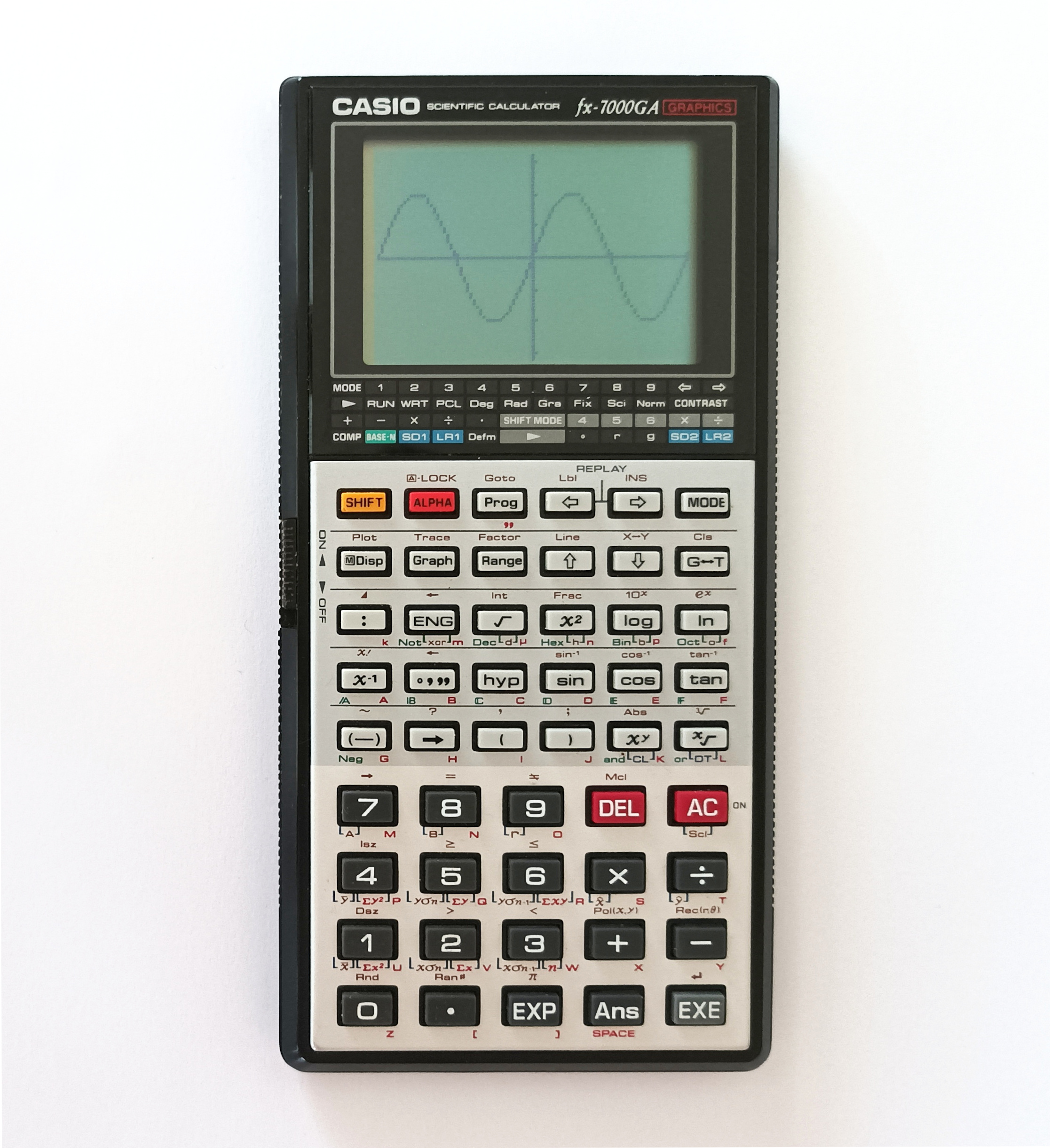
Casio fx-7000GA, c. 1987, an improved version of the fx-7000G

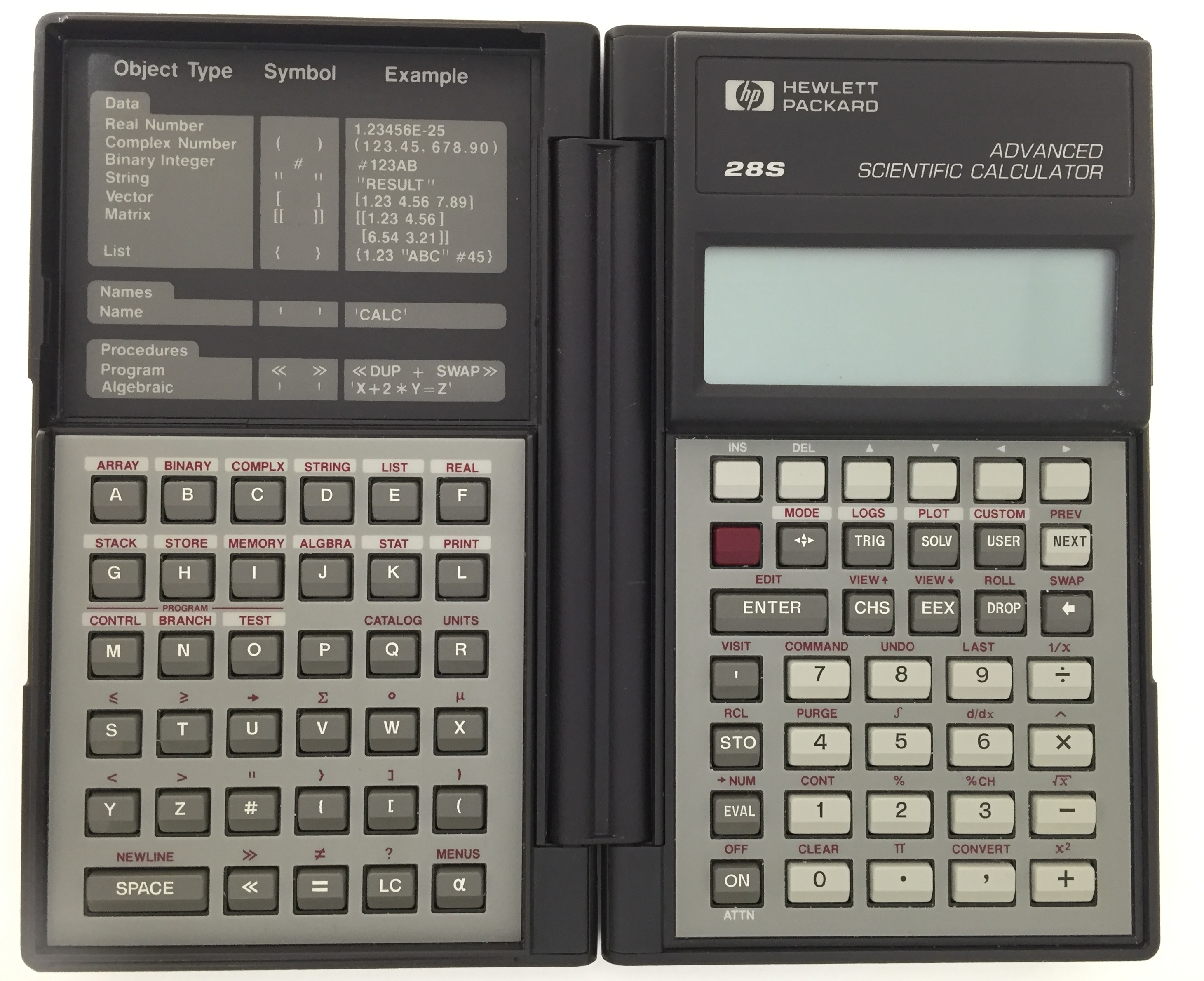
HP28S, c. 1989, the first graphing calculator made by Hewlett-Packard

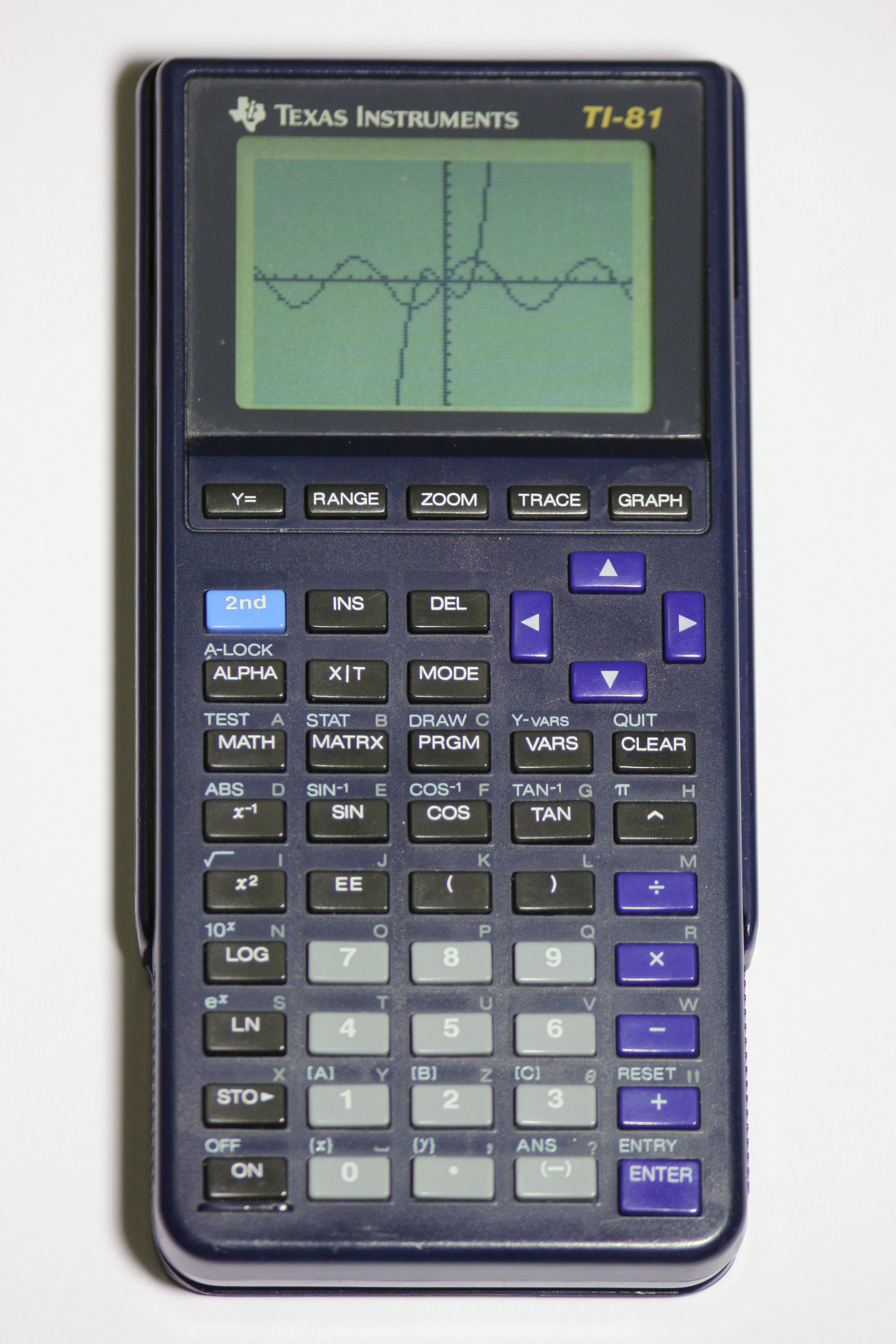
TI-81, c. 1990, the first graphing calculator made by Texas Instruments

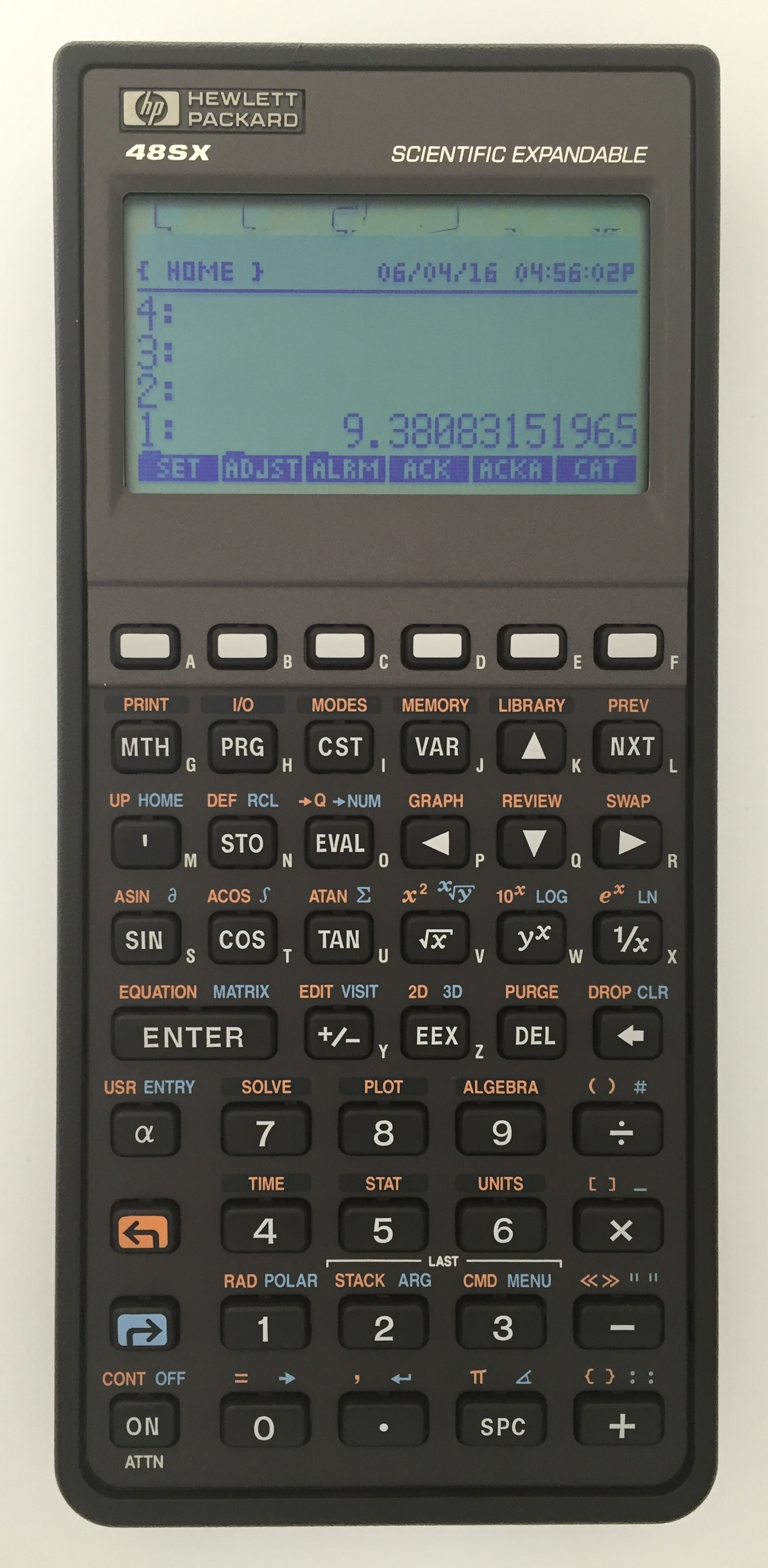
HP48 Series, c. 1992, the first graphing calculator by HP to use Reverse Polish Notation (RPN) and also SD card expansion

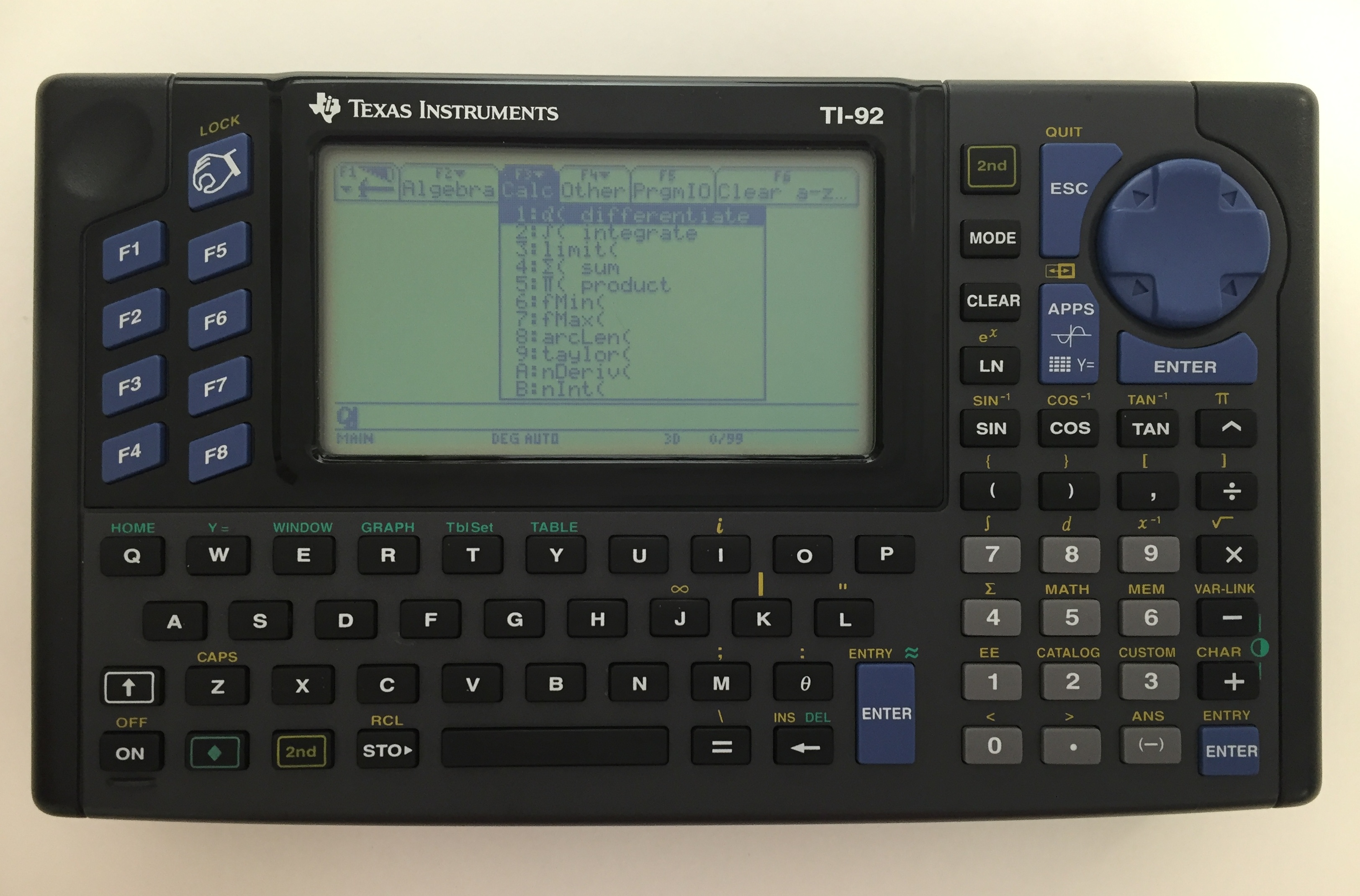
TI-92, c. 1996, the first graphing calculator in a PDA form factor, the first graphing calculator to have Computer Algebra System (CAS) and the first graphing calculator to have 3D graphing capability

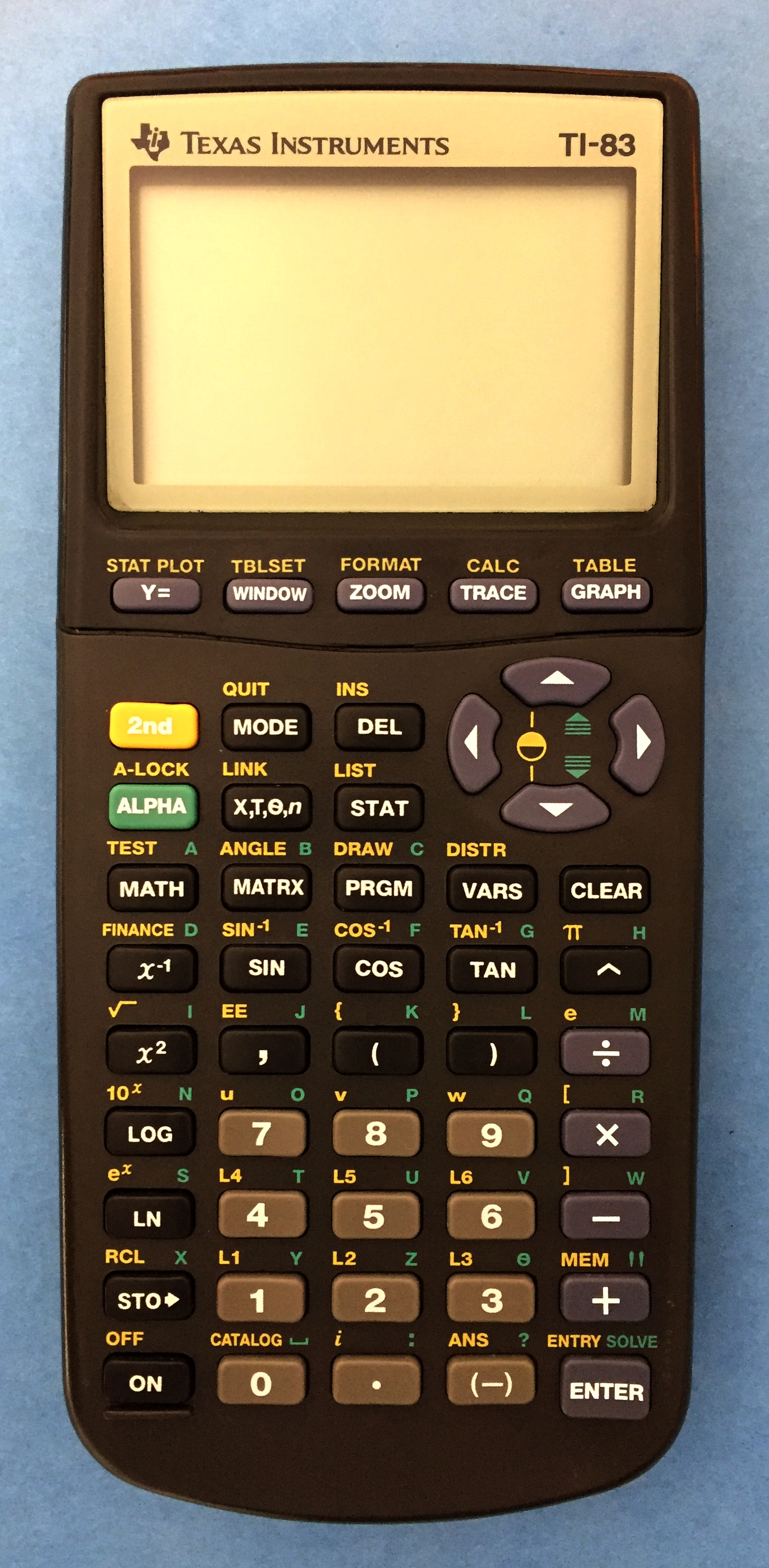
TI-83, c. 1996, one of the most commercially successful graphing calculators and a forebearer to the more successful TI-84 and TI-84 Plus

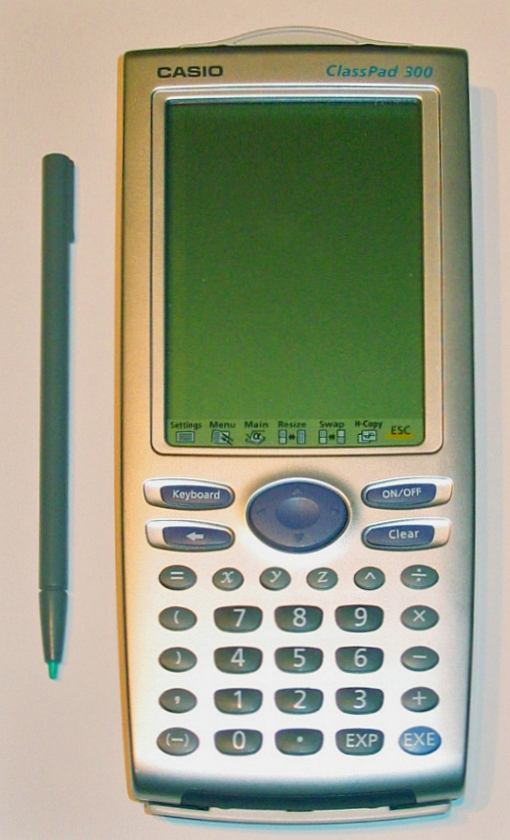
Casio Classpad 300, c. 2003, the first graphing calculator with a touchscreen display

== See also ==
- Personal digital assistant
- Category:Graphing calculators
- Category:Plotting software
- Scientific calculator
