= Casio HS-4 =

Electronic calculator

Casio HS-4 is a serie of solar-powered pocket-size basic calculators with a single-row 8 digits display, produced by Casio.

== Options ==
Casio HS-4 is a latest generation of Casio's cheapest basic calculators with only 6-functions: (Note: According to examples printed on product package, as it has no further operation instruction.)

How to use calculator
- (printed only on package back)
- Casio HS-4 instruction
- Casio HS-4G instruction

- Arithmetic operations: addition (+), subtraction (-), multiplication (×), division (÷).
- Square root (√).
- Percentage (%), often used for profit margin percent (mark-up) calculation.

The rest of the buttons are intended for:

- All Clear (AC), also serves as power ON button on long hold. (Note: The is no power OFF button and calculators automatically switches off after more than 5 minutes of inactivity. If illumination was temporary blocked or is insufficient (less than 50 Lux or 100 Lux, depends on model) there could be glitches on display (fixable by reset with All Clear button in an environment with a sufficient illumination). Restarting the device clears all the previos calculations and memory register.)
- Clear (C) latest output or input to correct it.
- Decimal number input (from 0.0000001 up to 99999999) using digits buttons and decimal separator ("dot") button.
- Switching positive/negative number sign for input and output (^{+}/_{-}).
- Independent Memory operations (in single memory register space): clear (MC), read (MR), subtract (M-), add (M+).
- Total result output (=) and on-the-go previous steps result output (reusable for the next operation).

On display there ara indicators of negative number, use of memory register and error notification (in cases of stack overflow, memory overflow, division by zero or square root of negative numbers).

== Models ==
Data sources: official websites, collectors websites, approved calculator lists by educational institutions.

- HS-4 has 5×5 keyboard with an enlarged addition button, and abbreviated inline indicators.
- HS-4A is round-shaped with a rearranged keyboard layout to 4×6.
- HS-4D is round-shaped with all memory operations buttons placed on the top row.
- HS-4E has rearranged keyboard 4×6 layout with a usual size addition button, enhanced with flip over top.
- HS-4ER is a Euro calculator with rearranged 5×1+4×5 layout, enhanced with an enlarged display and abbreviated headline indicators (successed by with a flip side top).
- HS-4G is enhanced with headline indicators shown as full words (it is slim and almost equals credit card size)

Casio produced many similar solar-powered (HS-7/8/10, SL-300, ultra-slim SL-770/900), battery-powered (HL-4/4A) and dual-powered (HS-8V/8VA, Euro calculators HS-8VER/8VERA) models, were some models has small changes or minor additional features (like a mark-up calculation (MU) button, metal-covers, etc.).

Study Cal (SL-450/450L/450S/460L/450S, NU-7) is a dual-powered rugged school edition of HS-4 serie for daily use, enanced with a key rollover function, thousands separator and actual operation signs indication. It is comparable to Texas Instruments TI-108.

OH-450L/460L is an enlarged overhead projectable semitransparent calculator version of SL-450L/460L.

== Educational use ==
Calculators of this serie approved for use in most of exams in many countries (including Australia, Canada, Ireland, New Zealand, Singapore, Taiwan, UK, USA, etc.), and in cases were the use of scientific, programmable and graphing calculators is prohibited. Some testing centers provides verified calculators from own storage if the use of personal calculators is not permitted by exam policy.

In some cases approved scientific non-graphing non-programmable calculators permitted (Casio fx-82 Solar/fx-260 Solar for GED Part 1, Casio fx-991CW ClassWiz for Cambridge International Examinations), ortherwise use of any calculators totally prohibited (for GED Part 2, in Japan during Undergraduate exams, in Ukraine during External independent evaluation). (Note: Rodon MK 05, produced in the mid 1990s, was the only solar-powered basic calculator marketed as Made in Ukraine.)

=== Alternatives ===
Approved alternatives are Texas Instruments TI-108, Sharp EL-233/240/243 series, or other 4/5-function calculators with square root function (such as Canon AS-8 and LS-270H, Citizen SLD-100 and LD-110, etc.). (Note: All has different layouts and indicators locations on displays according its official product images.)

Casio Film Card calculators was a serie of ultra-slim solar-powered basic calculators in a credit card size (ID-1 card), followed by other manufacturers.

Casio fx-82 Solar/fx-260 Solar serie is the cheapest solar-powered non-graphing non-programmable scientific calculator produced by Casio.
