= Casio fx-82 series =

Series of Casio calculators

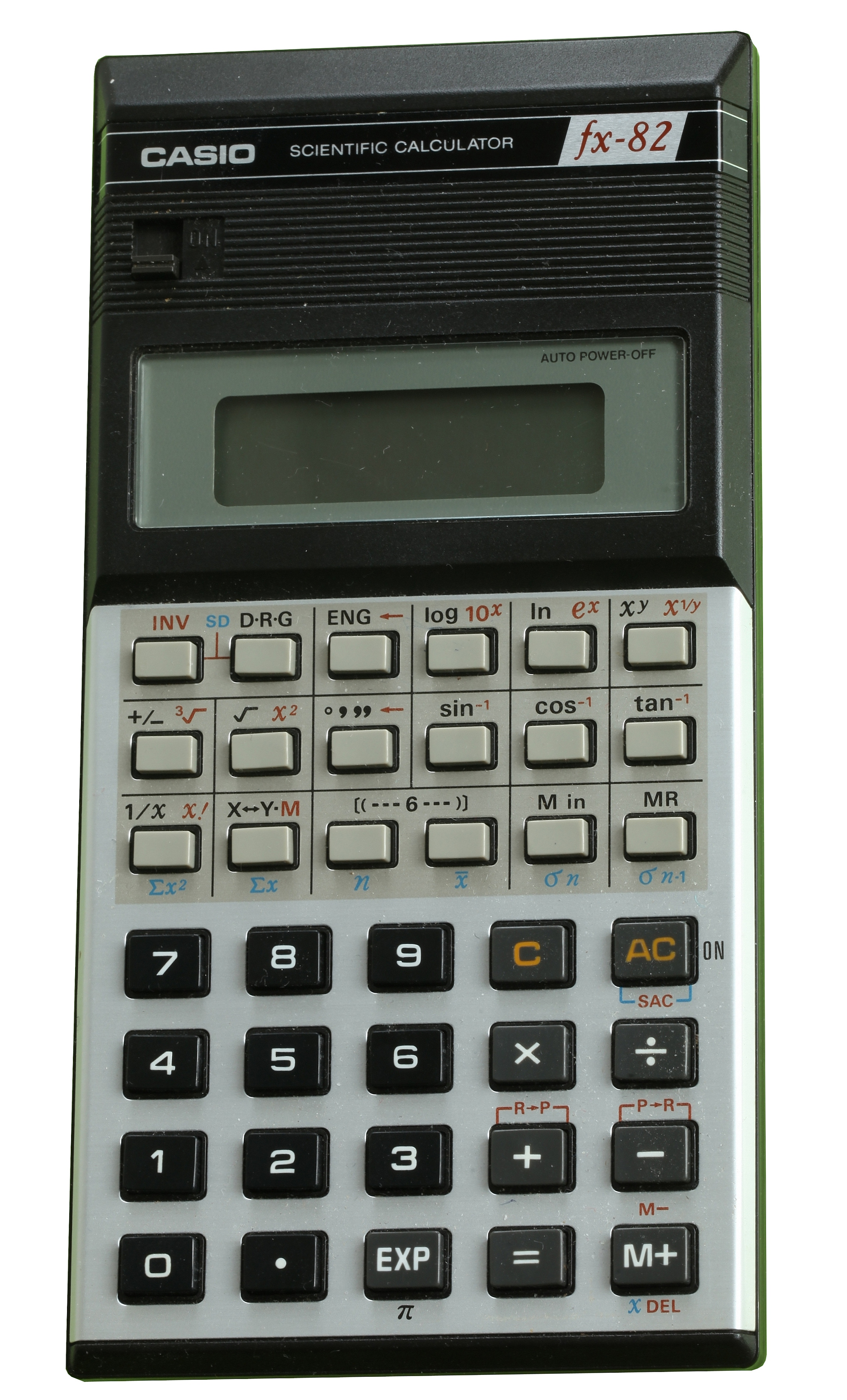
Casio fx-82

Casio fx-82 series is a series of Casio calculators targeted for school usage. It began in 1982, when the company launched Casio fx-82 as an upgrade of Casio fx-80. Since then, it received several upgrades, specially when the algebraic was substituted for the Visually Perfect Algebraic Method. Most of the calculators are scientific, except for Casio fx-82NL, which is semi programmable.

== History ==
Casio fx-82 was introduced in 1982 as an upgrade of Casio fx-80, an algebraic scientific calculator designed for school usage. Later, Casio expanded it to a whole series. From 1987 forward, Casio announced a new fx-82 model a year, to keep up with the competition.

In 1997, Casio implemented Visually Perfect Algebraic Method on the series, further improving its graphic interface.

== Models ==
=== Casio fx-82 ===
Released in 1982, the Casio fx-82 was an upgrade of Casio fx-80. The only difference between the models was that fx-82 had a better display, made by Epson and it was cheaper than Casio fx-81.

In 1985, fx-82 was discontinued for Casio fx-82A, which contained a new case.

In 1987, Casio fx-82B was released. It was a cheaper version of more modern calculators, featuring 8+2 digit display, an off button that substituted the slider key, and it was capable of performing percentage operation, random number generation, round-off operation, and hyperbolic functions.

In 1988, Casio fx-82C was released, featuring design changes to make it cheaper than its predecessor. It came with flexible thin PCBs and mounted bare circuits, that made soldering unnecessary.

=== Fraction ===
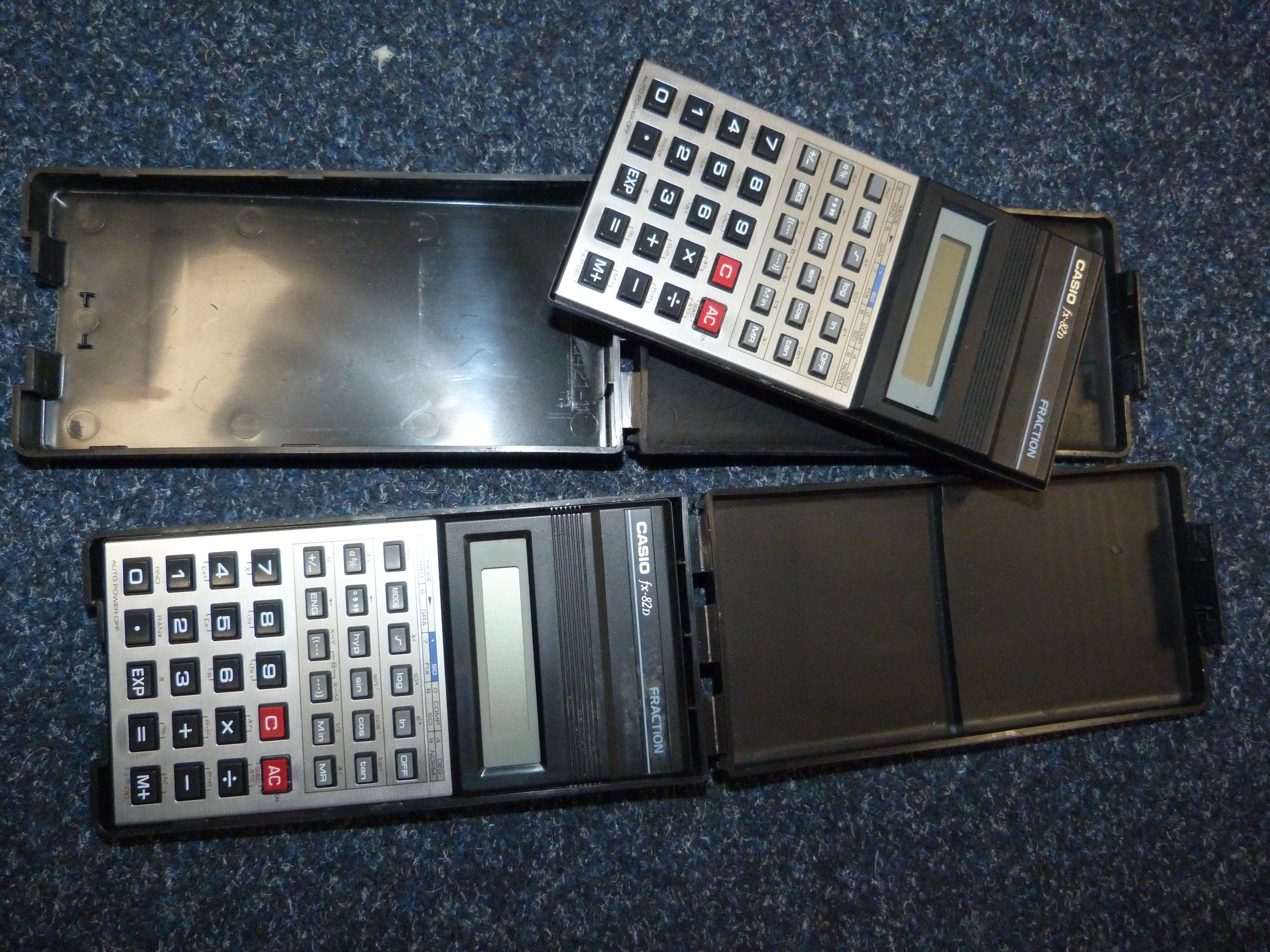
Casio fx-82D

In 1989, Casio fx-82D was released. It was identical to its predecessor, but it was capable of changing its display for performing operations using fractions.

In 1990, Casio fx-82L was released, featuring a bigger display that would become the industry's standard.

In 1992, Casio fx-82LB changed the old pouch for a hard case that could be used as a stand.

In the same year, Casio fx-82 SOLAR was released. Its main difference from previous calculators was the absence of an off button, as it kept working through solar energy. It was also smaller, had bigger buttons and added cubic functions. An update titled Casio fx-82 SOLAR II was later released.

In 1994, Casio fx-82 SUPER was released. It was a reiteration of fx-82 using Super-FX technology, capable of computing transcendental functions way faster than its predecessors. It also displayed 10+2 digits.

In 1996, Casio fx-82SX updated its predecessor's design by adding a sliding cover. It also had extra statistical functions.

=== V.P.A.M. ===
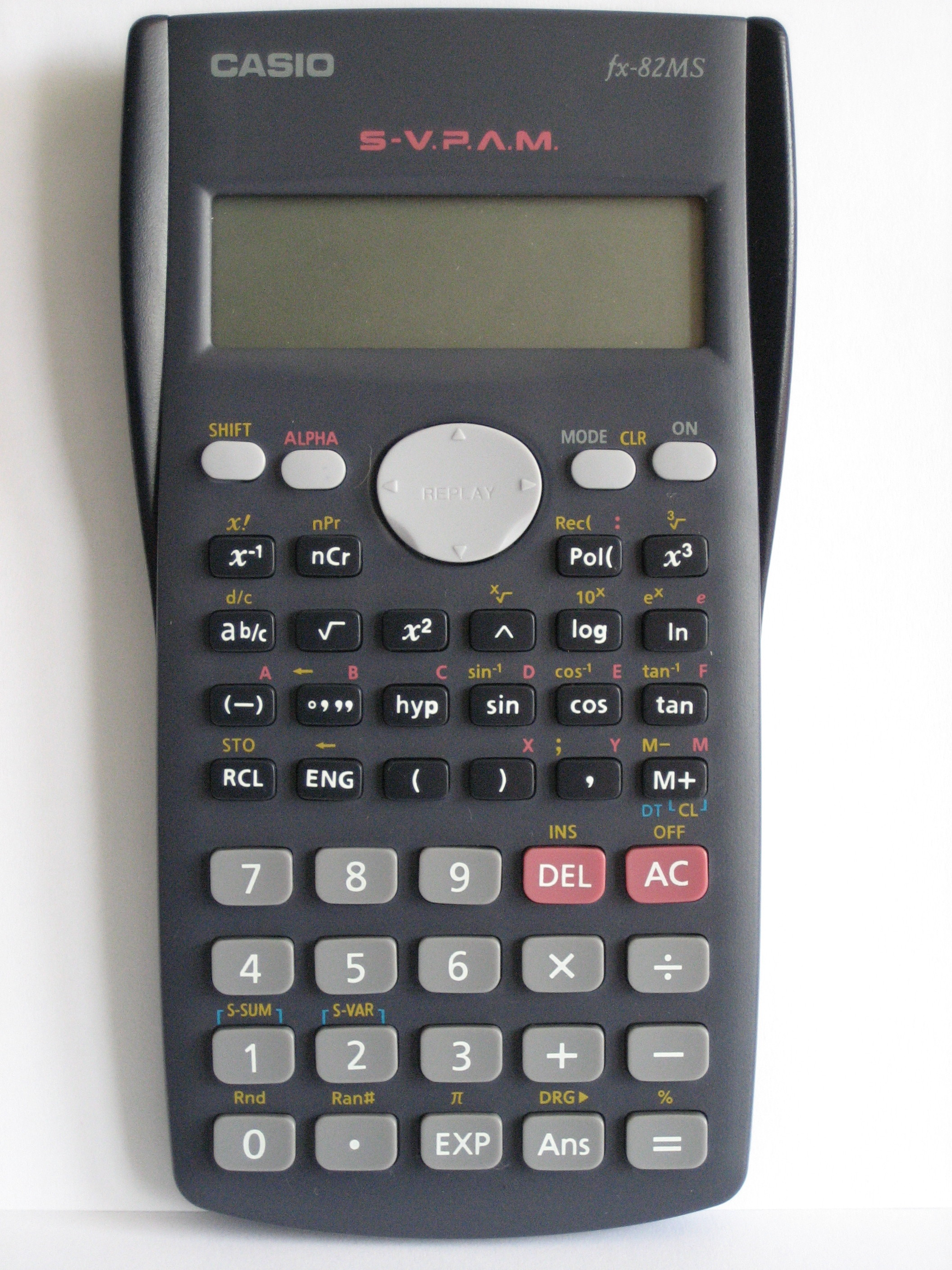
Casio fx-82MS

In 1997, Casio fx-82W was released. It implemented VPAM (Visually Perfect Algebraic Method) into scientific calculators, a technique previously only applied into programmable calculators. It changed the operation method from algebraic to formula-interpreting. The calculator also had a two-line LCD display, 9 memory slots and a replay function, to edit or correct expressions.

=== S-V.P.A.M. ===
In 1998, Casio fx-82TL was implemented, substituting VPAM for Super-VPAM.

In 2001, Casio fx-82MS was released. With more RAM available, it greatly expanded the memory slots. It also redesigned the buttoms and the statistics mode.

=== Natural-V.P.A.M. ===
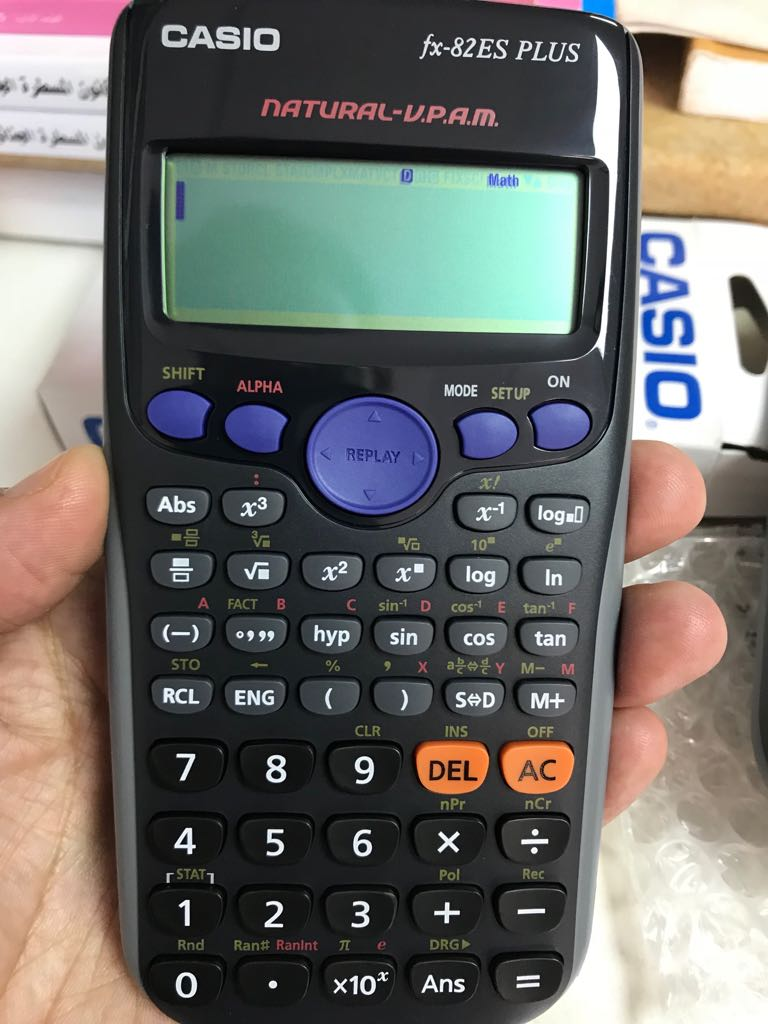
Casio fx-82ES Plus

In 2004, Casio fx-82ES was released. It operated on Natural-VPAM, a new operating system, permitting formulas to be displayed in two or more lines, as they are usually expressed by hand. It also uses notation systems and has editing capacities that makes it more intuitive to use compared to its predecessors. It also permitted other types of operations, such as matrix operations. It was twice improved with Casio fx-82ES Plus (2008) and Casio fx-82ES Plus II (2023).

In 2005, the regional Australian Casio fx-82AU Plus was released. It was updated for Casio fx-82AU Plus II in 2013. Other regional calculators made for the series were the South African Casio fx-82ZA PLUS, Casio fx-82ZA PLUS II and Casio fx-82ZA PLUS II BU.

In 2021 Casio fx-82MS II was released, updating its OS.

=== ClassWiz ===
In 2015, Casio fx-82EX was released. It further updated Natural-V.P.A.M.'s visuals for the secondary education in Switzerland. It also implemented a random number generator, that varies from 1 to 6.

In 2023, Casio fx-82NL was released. It is the first semi programmable calculator of the series, with implemented graphics, expanded matrix operations, better precision and QR codes, that expose the results in an online environment.

Other calculators from this series are Casio fx-82CE X and Casio fx-82CW.

== See also ==
- Casio V.P.A.M. calculators
- Casio graphic calculators
