= Casio fx-39 =

Scientific calculator manufactured by Casio and released in 1978

Casio fx-39 Scientific Calculator
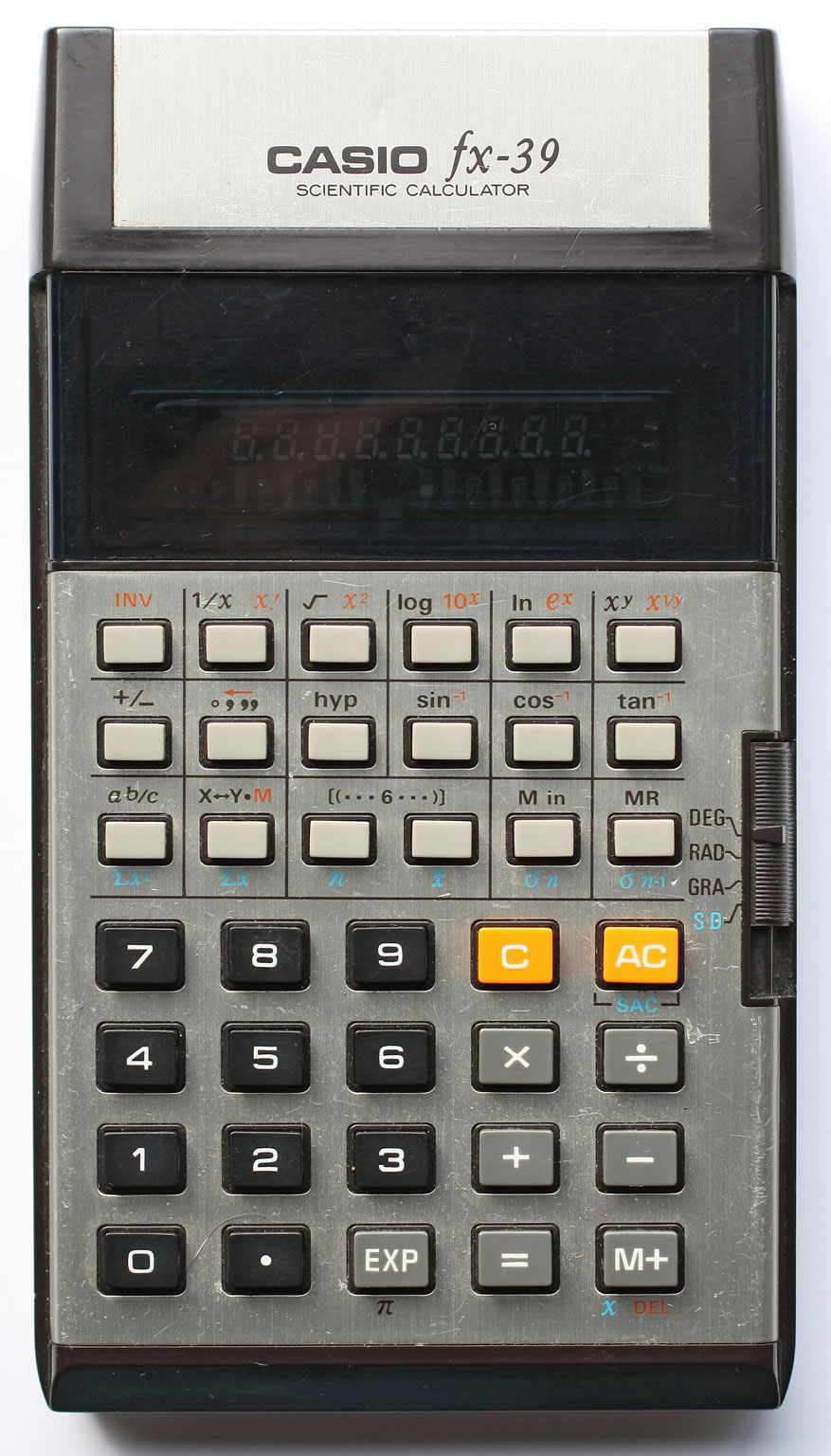
- Casio fx-39
- Type: Scientific
- Manufacturer: Casio
- Introduced: 1978
- Predecessor: fx-29

Calculator
- Entry mode: Infix
- Precision: 8 digits mantissa, ±99 exponent
- Display type: vacuum fluorescent display (VFD)
- Display size: 8 Characters +1 for sign

Programming
- Programming language(s): Not programmable

Other
- Power supply: 2×AA or AC adapter
- Power consumption: 0.75W
- Weight: 177g, 6.3 oz (including batteries)
- Dimensions: 15.2x8.4x2.25 cm, 6"×3+3/8"x7/8"

The fx-39 is a scientific calculator manufactured by Casio released in 1978 and is one of several models to share the same physical design format.

== Display ==
The unit features a blue-green, light-emitting vacuum fluorescent display (VFD). The display device itself has 9 seven segment digits, 8 of which are used for numeric output, the 9th being for the minus sign or to accommodate a space for 6+2 scientific notation. Although only capable of displaying 6 figures when using scientific notation, the calculator works internally to 8. A vacuum fluorescent display (VFD) is a display device used commonly on consumer-electronics equipment such as video cassette recorders, car radios, and microwave ovens. A VFD operates on the principle of cathodoluminescence, roughly similar to a cathode ray tube, but operating at much lower voltages.

== Design ==
The physical design was derived from fx-29: it had an impressive step forward from previous, more boxy, models such as the fx-19; sporting three rows of scientific function keys, a stylish metal fascia and rather novel four-position slide switch on the right side. This switch is used to select the trigonometric mode (Degrees, Radians or Gradians) or statistical operation. The unit is pocket sized and originally came with a black plastic slip cover to protect it.

== Features ==
As well as the four standard functions and a memory, it has square root, square, change sign, reciprocal, factorial, pi, powers, trigonometry, common and natural logarithms as well as statistics and the following:

- Fractions. Casio continued to offer their unique rational number arithmetic first introduced in the AL-10, along with their novel use of an L-shaped character to display "over". Due to limitations both in working with rationals and the display, only 3 digit numerators or denominators are allowed, otherwise the value reverts to floating point.
- Time Arithmetic. The fx-39 has no real-time clock, but it can add and subtract hours, minutes and seconds displaying the result in sexagesimal. The degree symbol is represented by a small "zero" made from the upper four segments of the display (like an 8 without the bottom loop).

Casio introduced a number of improvements which were to be continued into subsequent models:

- Physical memory addition (M+) key. The fx-29 has it as 2nd-level function in function. By this change equals key moved one position left and less-used π number functionality moved from physical key to 2nd-level of exponential function (EXP) key.
- Parentheses the previous model, the fx-29, did not have parentheses despite also being a scientific calculator. The fx-39 has 6 levels of brackets.
- Operator Precedence. The fx-39 was one of the first to offer order of operations, where 2+3*5 is 17 and not 25. This feature is almost universally assumed on modern scientific calculators, but this was a new feature in 1978. In contrast the fx-29 did not have operator precedence.
- Hyperbolic Functions. Casio introduced hyperbolic functions in the fx-39 along with their inverses. To accommodate this, the "arc" key of the previous models was changed into the, now familiar, "INV" key. In the previous version, the hyperbolic functions had to be carried out by using the exponential (e^x) function key, employing the formulas:

sinh x = (e^x – e^-x)/2 and cosh x = (e^x + e^-x)/2.

== Power ==
The unit is powered by 2 AA cells held within the battery compartment, which occupies a cavity behind the display. Alternatively, it can be powered using the Casio mains adapter through a socket on the top of the unit.

== Successors ==
The closest design to fx-39 introduced in slim-size solar-powered fx-950: it had the same layout and similar physical angle mode switch (on the left side, that was replaced in later models with shortkeys) and was one of the first in its size with 10-digit display. Casio continuied producing 8-digit calculators since then and introduced ultra-slim fx-915 (marketed as required only 50 Lux, instead of 300 Lux for fx-950). Latest model in the single row scientific calculators series is 10-digit solar powered fx-82 Solar II (marketed as fx-260 Solar II in USA), comparable with TI-30 ECO RS and HP 6s Solar.
