= Sharp EL-500W series =

- Manufacturer: Sharp Corporation
- Type: Scientific

Sharp EL-500W series include a range of scientific calculators made by Sharp Corporation, capable of displaying 2 lines, with multi-line playback. It is the successor to the Sharp EL-500V series.

== Features ==
Starting with the W series, this product line supports dual-line displays with multiple line playback, constant calculation, chain calculation, similar to the Casio fx-MS series, TI-34 II Explorer Plus.

The upper line shows entered expression (up to 12 characters at a time).

The basic EL-509W, EL-531W models includes 272 functions, which include power/root/logarithm functions, trigonometry functions, factorials, random functions, fractions, angle unit conversion, polar/cartesian coordinate conversion, binary/pental/octal/hexadecimal calculations (including logical operations), 1-2 variable statistics with 6 regression models (linear, logarithmic, exponential, power, inverse, quadratic). Calculations are done in 14 digits internally.

- EL-509W uses two LR44 batteries
- EL-531WG uses two LR44 batteries and solar cells.
- EL-531WH runs on one AA battery instead of two LR44 batteries.

EL-520W adds 52 physical constants, 44 unit conversions, complex number calculation, 2-3 variable linear equation solver, quadratic equation/cubic function equation solver, Newton generic equation solver, numeric derivative/integral functions, formula memory (max 4 formulae, 256 characters total), algebraic substitution (simulation calculation) to EL-509/531W, for total of 419 functions. It is powered by 2 LR44 batteries or light.

EL-506W adds matrix calculation, list calculation (max 4 lists, 16 elements/list) to EL-520W, for total of 469 functions.

EL-500M is a single line version of EL-509W, which contains only the dot matrix line. Dot matrix line only shows 11 characters. Memory register is reduced from 9 to 1. Removed functions include engineering unit display mode, cubic root/power, hyperbolic trigonometry, random dice, random coin, random integer, angle unit conversion, polar/cartesian coordinate conversion, multi-line playback, binary/pental/octal/hexadecimal calculations, 2-variable statistics, 2-key roll-over. However, it adds reduction study, highest common factor/lowest common multiple, quotient/remainder calculation. Total function is 131. The keyboard is not plastic like the others in the lineup.

All the models above support Direct Algebraic Logic (D.A.L.), which is an infix input system used by Sharp similar to Casio's V.P.A.M.

EL-501W does not support D.A.L., and only has the 7-segment digit line in EL-509W. It only supports 8-digit mantissa display in scientific notation mode. Functions are further stripped down from EL-500W. Removed functions include last answer recall, nPr/nCr, reduction study, highest common factor/lowest common multiple, quotient/remainder calculation, equation playback. However, it gains cubic power/root, hyperbolic trigonometry, angle unit conversion, polar/cartesian coordinate conversion, complex number calculation, Bin/Oct/Hex calculations (without logical operations) over EL-500W. Total function is 131.

=== Regional variants ===
EL-506W is sold as EL-546W in Canada.

== EL-730 series ==
EL-730 series uses the same interface as the EL-500W series, but contains financial functions.

EL-735 displays 9-digit mantissa in scientific display mode. There is only 1 memory register. Functions include Cost/Sell Margin, Compound Interest, Amortisation of Payment, Bond Calculation, 360-Day Calendar, Non-Uniform Cash Flow, Constant Calculation, Chain Calculation, 1-Var./2-Var. Statistics, Date Calculation, Database, Sign Change, Right Shift. It is powered by 1 CR2016 battery.

EL-733 is a scaled-down version that does not have the dot matrix line. It displays 8-digit mantissa in scientific display mode. Removed functions include Bond Calculation, 360-Day Calendar, Date Calculation, Database. It is powered by 2 LR44 batteries.
