= TI-7 MathMate =

Calculator manufactured by Texas Instruments

The TI-7 MathMate is a basic educational calculator by Texas Instruments, designed for students in grades K–3. The MathMate was unique in that it automatically performed the order of operations. The calculator was solar powered. The MathMate slotted in between the TI-108 and the TI-12 Math Explorer.

The TI-7 MathMate was eventually replaced by the TI-10, which features a two-line display.
