= TI-12 Math Explorer =

Calculator manufactured by Texas Instruments

The TI-12 Math Explorer is an educational calculator designed for students grades K–9. It was introduced in 1987. The Math Explorer slotted above the TI-7 MathMate by offering fraction and exponent capabilities, as well as a pi button.

The Math Explorer has since been discontinued and was replaced by the two-line TI-15 Explorer.
