= Casio fx-82 Solar =

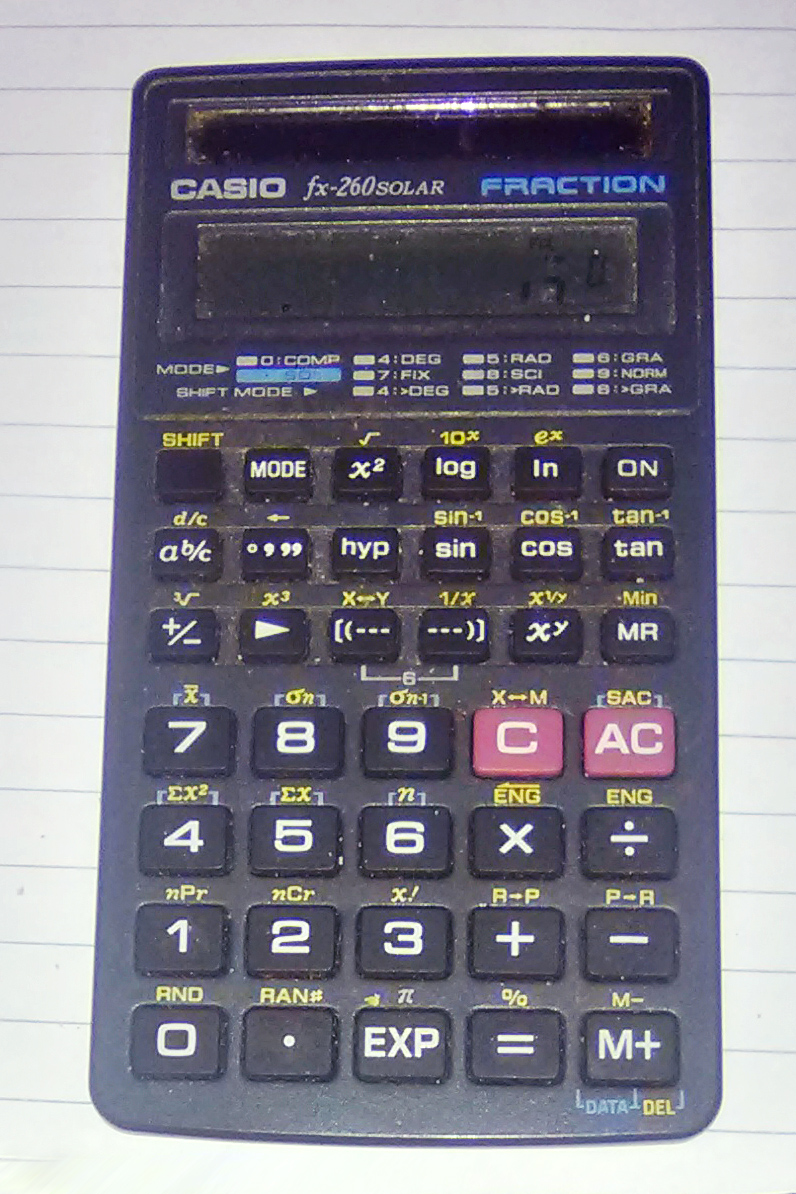
Casio fx-260 Solar calculator

Casio fx-82 Solar (also fx-260 Solar) is a series of solar-powered Casio's scientific calculators with a single-row 10+2 digits display (10-digit mantissa and 2-digit exponent in a scientific notation mode), with support of various modes and 144 functions in a total.

== Origin ==
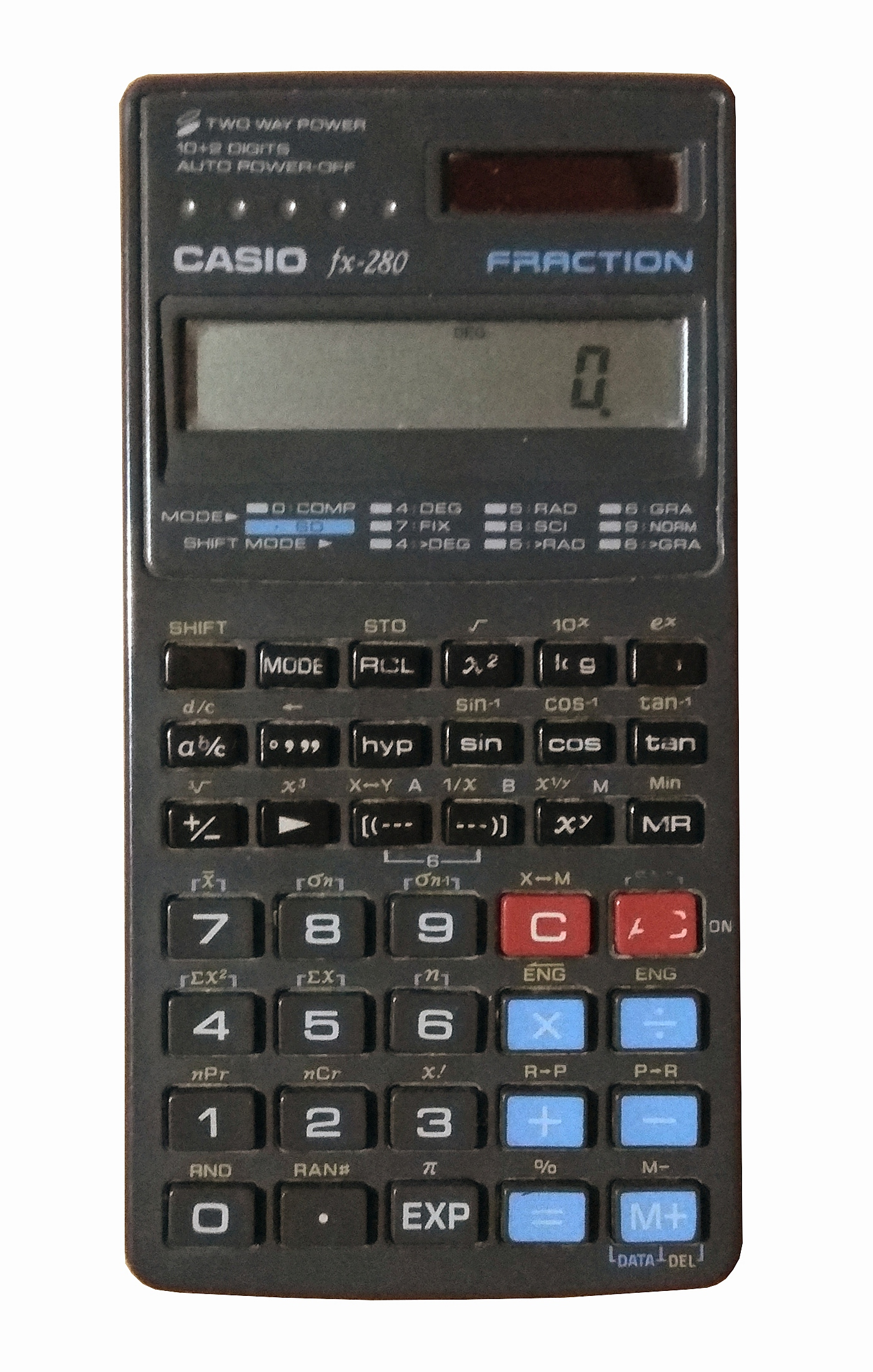
Casio fx-280 calculator

Casio fx-82 Solar is a modern generation of cheapest solar-powered scientific calculators derived from fx-39's successors:

- battery-powered: fx-82/82 Super and fx-250HC;
- solar-powered: fx-85 and ultra-slim fx-915/995. (Note: Ultra-slim models introduced innovative solar panel required only 50 Lux of illuminance to power the device, instead of 300 Lux required for earlier slim fx-900/950 models with a much larger solar panel.)

== Models ==
- fx-82 Solar (fx-260 Solar in USA, fx-260A in Japan)
- fx-85B (fx-280 in USA; dual-powered and enlarged version of fx-82 Solar)
- fx-82 Solar II (fx-260 Solar II in USA; upgraded compact version of fx-82 Solar)

Special school editions produced with a disabled and blanked fraction input/output button (a^{b}/_{c}) for GED exam:

- fx-260 Solar School ("non-fraction" version of fx-260 Solar)
- fx-260 Solar II NF ("non-fraction" version of fx-260 Solar II)

== Educational use ==
Calculators of this serie approved for use at exams in many countries and regions (including Australia, Canada, Ireland, New Zealand, Singapore, Taiwan, UK, USA, etc.), and in cases where the use of programmable and graphing calculators is prohibited. Some testing centers provides verified calculators from own storage if the use of personal calculators is not permitted by exam policy. For some exams in UK and Ireland all models designated as fx-83/85 serie are permitted, while the use of any models designated as fx-82 serie prohibited.

In some cases only basic arithmetic calculators permitted (such as Casio HS-4G) or use of any calculators totally prohibited (in Japan during Undergraduate exams, in Ukraine during External independent evaluation (Note: Rodon MK01, produced in mid 1990s, was the only solar-powered scientific calculator marketed as Made in Ukraine.)).

=== Emulator ===
External image
- Casio fx-82 Solar II Emulator

Casio Education Taiwan website provides official Casio fx-82 Solar II emulator software for educational purposes.

=== Alternatives ===
Approved alternatives are Texas Instruments TI-30 ECO RS/TI-30Xa, Hewlett-Packard HP-6s/HP-6s Solar, Sharp EL-501/EL-510, Canon F-502/502G/604/605G (battery-powered), Citizen SR-135N/SR-260N.

== Receptions ==
Australian electrical engineer and vlogger David L. Jones in his the EEVblog #1093 episode reviewed Casio fx-260 Solar vs fx-260 Solar II, praising latest model for the improved solar panel allowed to use it in an environment with 20 Lux illumination, overall improved performance and more precise result in performing the Mike Sebastian's Calculator Forensics test:

sin^{−1} ( cos^{−1} ( tan^{−1} ( tan ( cos ( sin ( 9 ) ) ) ) ) ) =

- 9.000015685 by fx-260 Solar calculator (same as early Casio V.P.A.M. calculators)
- 9.000007164 by fx-260 Solar II calculator (same as Casio fx-850P)
- 9.000000007 by Casio's fx-82ES/85ES/350S PLUS 2nd edition Emulator for Windows (same as real Casio Natural V.P.A.M. calculators)
- 9.000000000 by Casio's online ClassPad Math calculator (same as real Hewlett-Packard HP-30S and all of the modern software calculators)

== See also ==
- Casio fx-82 series
