= Quinary =

Base five numeral system

Quinary (base 5 or pental) is a numeral system with five as the base. A possible origination of a quinary system is that there are five digits on either hand.

In the quinary place system, five numerals, from 0 to 4, are used to represent any real number. According to this method, five is written as 10, twenty-five is written as 100, and sixty is written as 220.

As five is a prime number, only the reciprocals of the powers of five terminate, although its location between two highly composite numbers (4 and 6) guarantees that many recurring fractions have relatively short periods.

== Comparison to other radices ==
A quinary multiplication table
×	1	2	3	4	10	11	12	13	14	20
1	1	2	3	4	10	11	12	13	14	20
2	2	4	11	13	20	22	24	31	33	40
3	3	11	14	22	30	33	41	44	102	110
4	4	13	22	31	40	44	103	112	121	130
10	10	20	30	40	100	110	120	130	140	200
11	11	22	33	44	110	121	132	143	204	220
12	12	24	41	103	120	132	144	211	223	240
13	13	31	44	112	130	143	211	224	242	310
14	14	33	102	121	140	204	223	242	311	330
20	20	40	110	130	200	220	240	310	330	400

Numbers zero to twenty-five in standard quinary
Quinary	0	1	2	3	4	10	11	12	13	14	20	21	22
Binary	0	1	10	11	100	101	110	111	1000	1001	1010	1011	1100
Decimal	0	1	2	3	4	5	6	7	8	9	10	11	12
Quinary	23	24	30	31	32	33	34	40	41	42	43	44	100
Binary	1101	1110	1111	10000	10001	10010	10011	10100	10101	10110	10111	11000	11001
Decimal	13	14	15	16	17	18	19	20	21	22	23	24	25

Fractions in quinary
Decimal (periodic part)	Quinary (periodic part)	Binary (periodic part)
1/2 = 0.5	1/2 = 0.2	1/10 = 0.1
1/3 = 0.3	1/3 = 0.13	1/11 = 0.01
1/4 = 0.25	1/4 = 0.1	1/100 = 0.01
1/5 = 0.2	1/5 = 0.1	1/101 = 0.0011
1/6 = 0.16	1/11 = 0.04	1/110 = 0.001
1/7 = 0.142857	1/12 = 0.032412	1/111 = 0.001
1/8 = 0.125	1/13 = 0.03	1/1000 = 0.001
1/9 = 0.1	1/14 = 0.023421	1/1001 = 0.000111
1/10 = 0.1	1/20 = 0.02	1/1010 = 0.00011
1/11 = 0.09	1/21 = 0.02114	1/1011 = 0.0001011101
1/12 = 0.083	1/22 = 0.02	1/1100 = 0.0001
1/13 = 0.076923	1/23 = 0.0143	1/1101 = 0.000100111011
1/14 = 0.0714285	1/24 = 0.013431	1/1110 = 0.0001
1/15 = 0.06	1/30 = 0.013	1/1111 = 0.0001
1/16 = 0.0625	1/31 = 0.0124	1/10000 = 0.0001
1/17 = 0.0588235294117647	1/32 = 0.0121340243231042	1/10001 = 0.00001111
1/18 = 0.05	1/33 = 0.011433	1/10010 = 0.0000111
1/19 = 0.052631578947368421	1/34 = 0.011242141	1/10011 = 0.000011010111100101
1/20 = 0.05	1/40 = 0.01	1/10100 = 0.000011
1/21 = 0.047619	1/41 = 0.010434	1/10101 = 0.000011
1/22 = 0.045	1/42 = 0.01032	1/10110 = 0.00001011101
1/23 = 0.0434782608695652173913	1/43 = 0.0102041332143424031123	1/10111 = 0.00001011001
1/24 = 0.0416	1/44 = 0.01	1/11000 = 0.00001
1/25 = 0.04	1/100 = 0.01	1/11001 = 0.00001010001111010111

== Usage ==
Many languages use quinary number systems, including Gumatj, Nunggubuyu, Kuurn Kopan Noot, Luiseño, and Saraveca. Gumatj has been reported to be a true "5–25" language, in which 25 is the higher group of 5. The Gumatj numerals are shown below:

Number	Base 5	Numeral
1	1	wanggany
2	2	marrma
3	3	lurrkun
4	4	dambumiriw
5	10	wanggany rulu
10	20	marrma rulu
15	30	lurrkun rulu
20	40	dambumiriw rulu
25	100	dambumirri rulu
50	200	marrma dambumirri rulu
75	300	lurrkun dambumirri rulu
100	400	dambumiriw dambumirri rulu
125	1000	dambumirri dambumirri rulu
625	10000	dambumirri dambumirri dambumirri rulu

However, Harald Hammarström reports that "one would not usually use exact numbers for counting this high in this language and there is a certain likelihood that the system was extended this high only at the time of elicitation with one single speaker," pointing to the Biwat language as a similar case (previously attested as 5-20, but with one speaker recorded as making an innovation to turn it 5-25).

== Biquinary ==
In this section, the numerals are in decimal. For example, "5" means five, and "10" means ten.

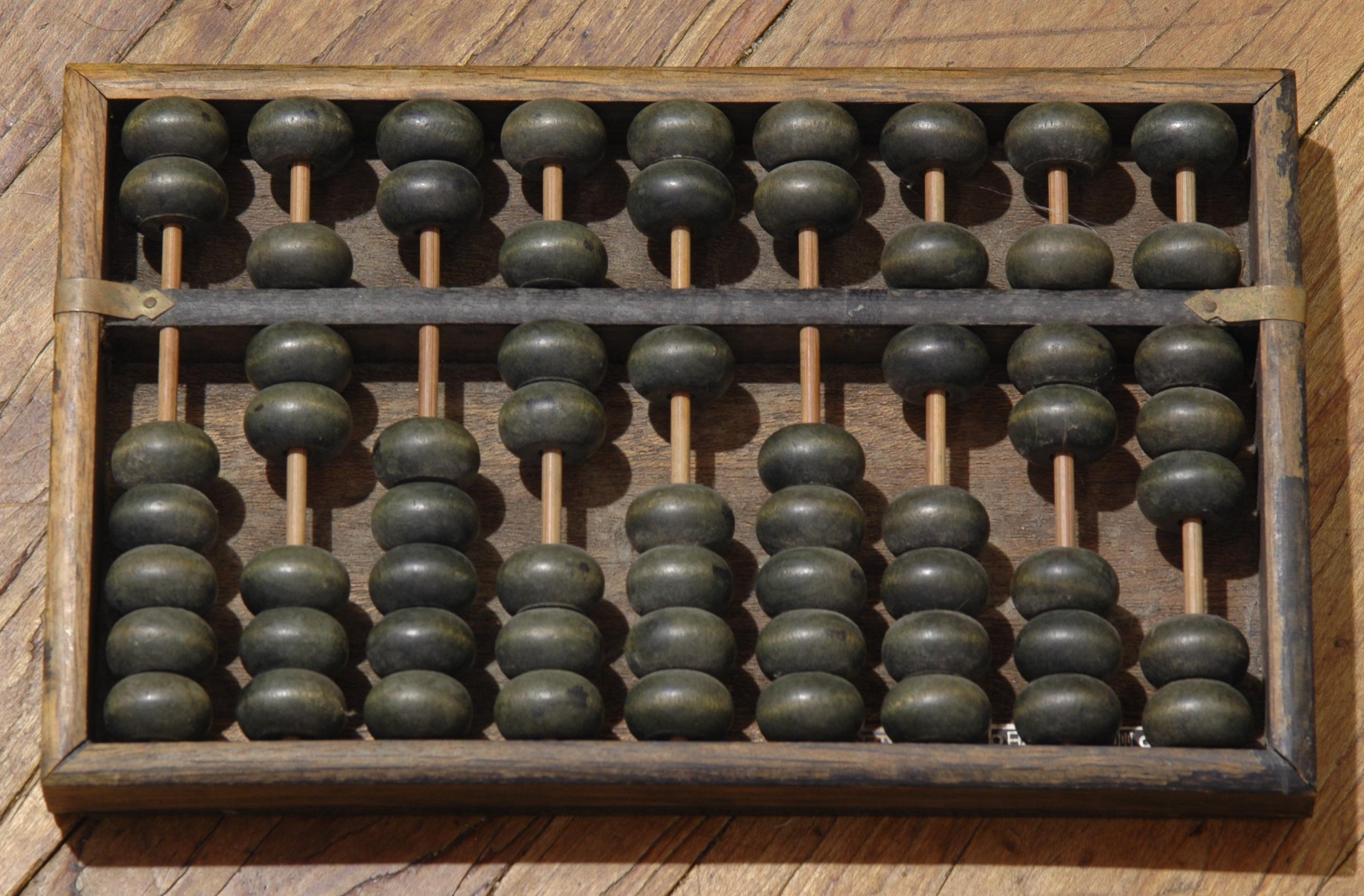
Chinese Abacus or suanpan

A decimal system with two and five as a sub-bases is called biquinary and is found in Wolof and Khmer. Roman numerals are an early biquinary system. The numbers 1, 5, 10, and 50 are written as I, V, X, and L respectively. Seven is VII, and seventy is LXX. The full list of symbols is:

Roman	I	V	X	L	C	D	M
Decimal	1	5	10	50	100	500	1000

Note that these are not positional number systems, meaning have no "place-keeping" zeros.

In theory, a number such as 73 could be written as IIIXXL (without ambiguity) and as LXXIII - but the former format would be in languages like Etruscan which was written from right to left. The latter format applies for Roman numerals which are written left to right, starting with larger to smaller values, even though roman numerals are derived from the Etruscan number symbols.

To extend Roman numerals to beyond thousands, a vinculum (horizontal overline) was added, multiplying the letter value by a thousand, e.g. overlined M̅ was one million. There is also no sign for zero. But with the introduction of inversions like IV and IX, it was necessary to keep the order from most to least significant.

Many versions of the abacus, such as the suanpan and soroban, use a biquinary system to simulate a decimal system for ease of calculation. Urnfield culture numerals and some tally mark systems are also biquinary. Units of currencies are commonly partially or wholly biquinary.

Bi-quinary coded decimal is a variant of biquinary that was used on a number of early computers including Colossus and the IBM 650 to represent decimal numbers.

== Calculators and programming languages ==
Few calculators support calculations in the quinary system, except for some Sharp models (including some of the EL-500W and EL-500X series, where it is named the pental system) since about 2005, as well as the open-source scientific calculator WP 34S.

== See also ==
- Bi-quinary coded decimal
- Pentadic numerals – Scandinavian numeral system
