= TI-108 =

Calculator manufactured by Texas Instruments

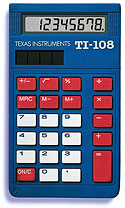
- A TI-108
- Type: Basic Calculator
- Manufacturer: Texas Instruments
- Introduced: 1986

Programming
- User memory: Single Number

Other
- Power supply: Solar Powered

The TI-108 is a basic handheld calculator manufactured by Texas Instruments aimed at introducing younger students to basic arithmetic and calculator functionality. The TI-108 is widely used among younger students due to its low cost, durability, and simplicity. Along with the more expensive and newer TI-10, this calculator targets the K-3 student group for whom it will likely be a first calculator. The TI-15 is targeted to older students.

== History ==
The TI-108 is the last member of the TI calculator family to continue a design language first introduced in the mid-1980s, with textured keys and straight edges with curved bottom corners, as well as a recessed frame around the display. This design was also shared with the landscape-aspect Galaxy line of scientific calculators, though the textured keys were not used on contemporary portrait-aspect designs due to a lack of space. The current model 108 is, at least externally, virtually identical to the original TI-108 introduced in 1990, and is the cheapest design in the TI calculator line.

Though the internal electronics are different, the TI-108 is fundamentally the same as the TI-1100II introduced in 1985, a four-function calculator with additional square root and percentage keys. TI-108s are mostly found and used in school classrooms.

== Memory keys ==
Basic calculators do not follow the order of operations and most of them do not have a command line in which parentheses can be entered; they merely evaluate each expression in the order in which they are given. The TI-108 has a very simple feature that stores one number in memory; it is by default zero. The M- and M+ keys will respectively subtract or add the number on the screen to the number in memory, and the MRC key recalls this memory number. By keeping the current number in memory, subtracting and adding to it with the memory keys, and then multiplying and dividing it in the normal fashion, a problem of arithmetic can be done in the proper order with the TI-108 without physically writing down results intermittently.

== Educational use ==
TI-108, together with Casio HS-4 (solar powered) and Sharp EL-233 (battery-powered) and EL-240/243 (dual-powered) are approved for the exams where the use of more advanced calculators are prohibited.

== See also ==
- TI-30 ECO RS
- Casio fx-82 Solar (Casio fx-260 Solar)
- TI-84 Plus series
- Casio fx-991 ClassWiz
