= TI-15 Explorer =

Calculator manufactured by Texas Instruments

TI-15 Explorer is a calculator designed by Texas Instruments, intended for use in classes from grades 3–6. It is the successor to the TI-12 Math Explorer. For younger students, TI recommends the use of the TI-108. For older students, TI recommends the use of the TI-73 Explorer.

Features include a 2-line pixel display (as opposed to the 7-segment display of several other calculators) and a quiz-like "problem-solving" mode with 3 difficulty levels. It also supports limited scientific capabilities, such as parentheses, fixed decimal, fractions, pi, and exponents.
