= Euro calculator =

Foreign exchange market

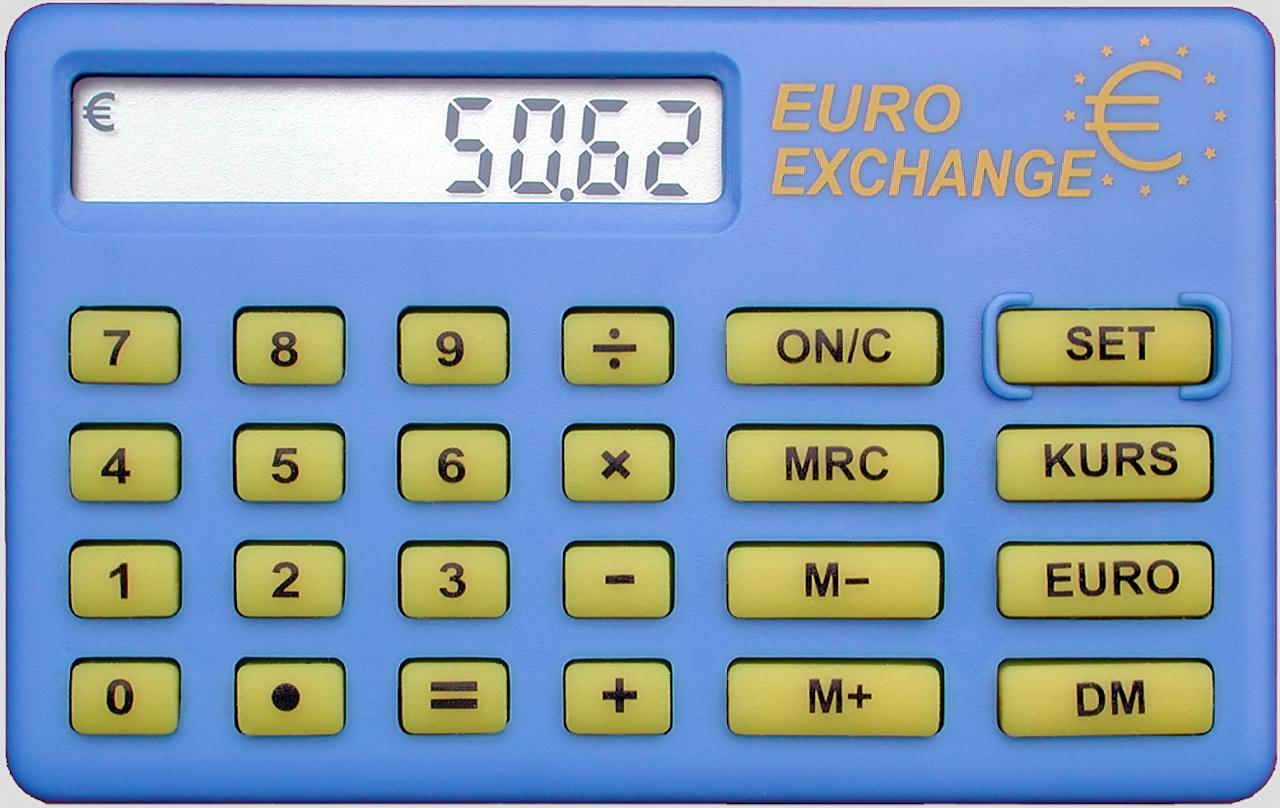
Simple euro calculator (Germany)

A euro calculator is a type of calculator in European countries (see eurozone) that adopted the euro as their official monetary unit. It functions like any other normal calculator, but it also includes a special function which allows one to convert a value expressed in the previously official unit (the peseta in Spain, for example) to the new value in euros, or vice versa. Its use became very popular within the population and commerce of these countries especially during the first few months after adopting the euro.

As so many were produced, they are also found outside the eurozone to help staff with conversions at airports or railway stations where the euro has a strong presence.
