= Casio V.P.A.M. calculators =

Family of scientific calculators by Casio

Casio V.P.A.M. calculators are scientific calculators made by Casio which use Casio's Visually Perfect Algebraic Method (V.P.A.M.), Natural Display or Natural V.P.A.M. input methods. V.P.A.M. is an infix system for entering mathematical expressions, used by Casio in most of its current scientific calculators. In the infix notation the precedence of mathematical operators is taken into account. According to Casio, in V.P.A.M. calculations can be input exactly as they are normally written. Functions, operators and symbols are shown on the calculator display and calculations are performed according to operator precedence.

== History ==
The V.P.A.M. brand was first used in 1994 when the fx-991S and other scientific calculators from the "S" series were released in Japan. In 1998, the Casio fx-991W model used a two-tier (multi-line) display and the system was termed as S-V.P.A.M. (Super V.P.A.M.). The model featured a 5×6-dot LCD matrix cells on the top line of the screen and a 7-segment LCD on the bottom line of the screen that had been used in Casio fx-4500P programmable calculators. The S-V.P.A.M. system was also used in the other W series models and also the MS series of calculators that followed. V.P.A.M. is similar to the Direct Algebraic Logic (D.A.L.) used by Sharp in some of their scientific calculators.

The fx-82ES introduced by Casio in 2004 was the first calculator to incorporate the Natural Textbook Display (or Natural Display) system. It allowed the display of expressions of fractions, exponents, logarithms, powers and square roots etc. as they are written in a standard textbook. Natural Display uses natural representation of mathematical expressions and formulas through a 96×31 dot matrix LCD. Casio uses the term Natural V.P.A.M. for the fx-ES Plus series of calculators which are the upgraded version of the fx-ES series.

In mid-2014, Casio introduced a new line of calculators called ClassWiz (stylized as C L A S S W I Z) for different markets, featuring a high resolution (192×63) dot matrix Natural Textbook Display and incorporating spreadsheet functions in some models. This series of calculators is called the fx-EX series and it succeeds the fx-ES Plus series of calculators.

In late 2022, Casio introduced a second generation of ClassWiz line, called fx-CW. The series was originally called the fx-EZ series, but was later changed to the fx-CW series. Calculators in this line have an updated user interface, and come with 4-gradation displays.

In 2025, Casio released a revised version of the fx-CW, called fx-CW 2nd edition, also known as the fx-CW+, or fx-CW II. In markets that had not received the original fx-CW line, the series continued under the same name, fx-CW. This edition reintroduced several functions that had formerly been available in the fx-EX but absent from the original fx-CW.

== List of calculators ==
Note: Italic figures in parentheses indicate the year of introduction, e.g.: (c. 1994)

=== V.P.A.M. (Visually perfect algebraic method) ===
Models:

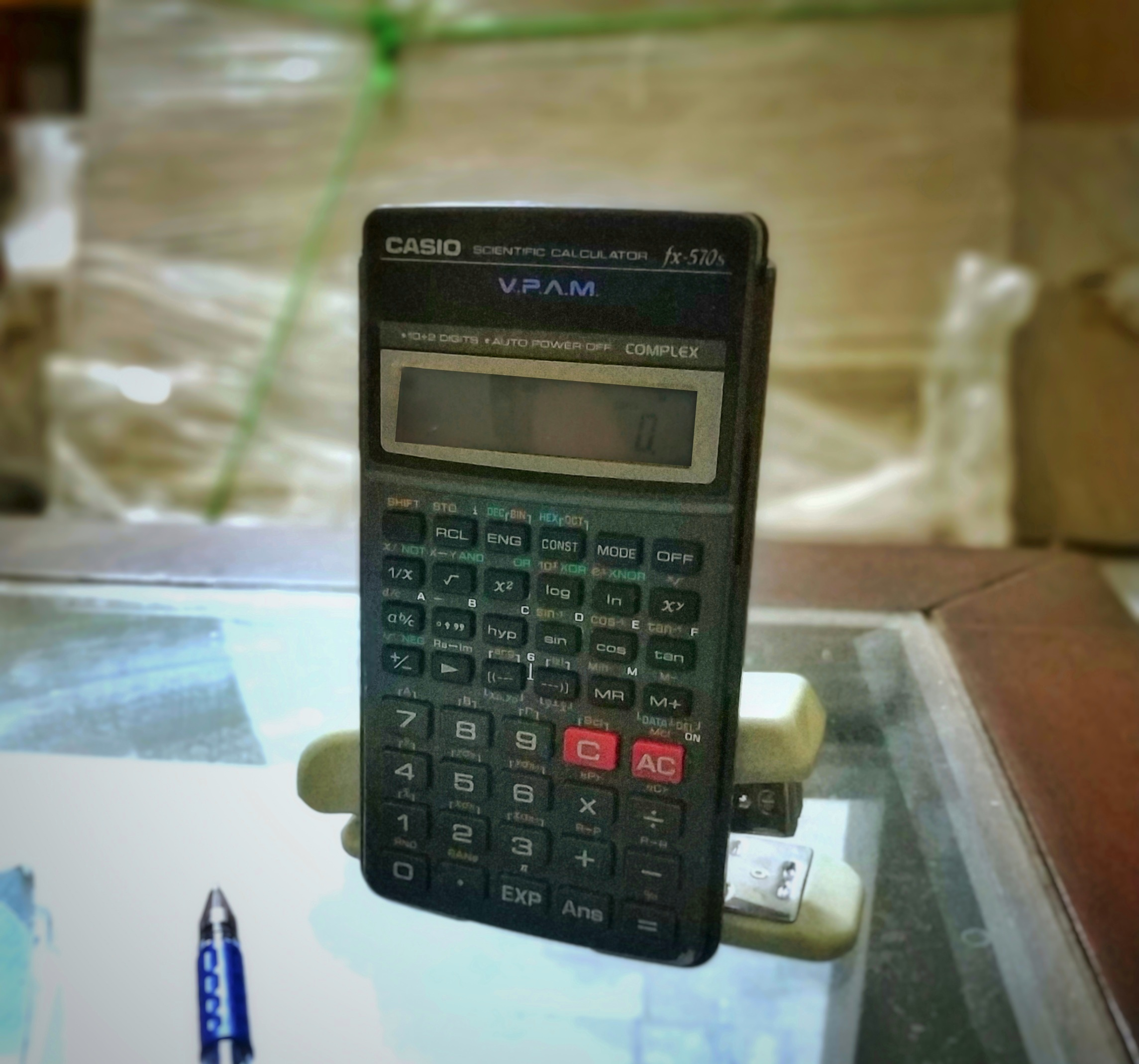
Casio fx-570S with V.P.A.M.

- fx-991S, 570S, 911S, 992S (c. 1994)
- fx-115S, 100S, 122S (c. 1995)
- fx-993S (c. 1996)
- fx-300S (a simplified 8+2 digit version)

=== S-V.P.A.M. (Two-line, Multi-replay) ===
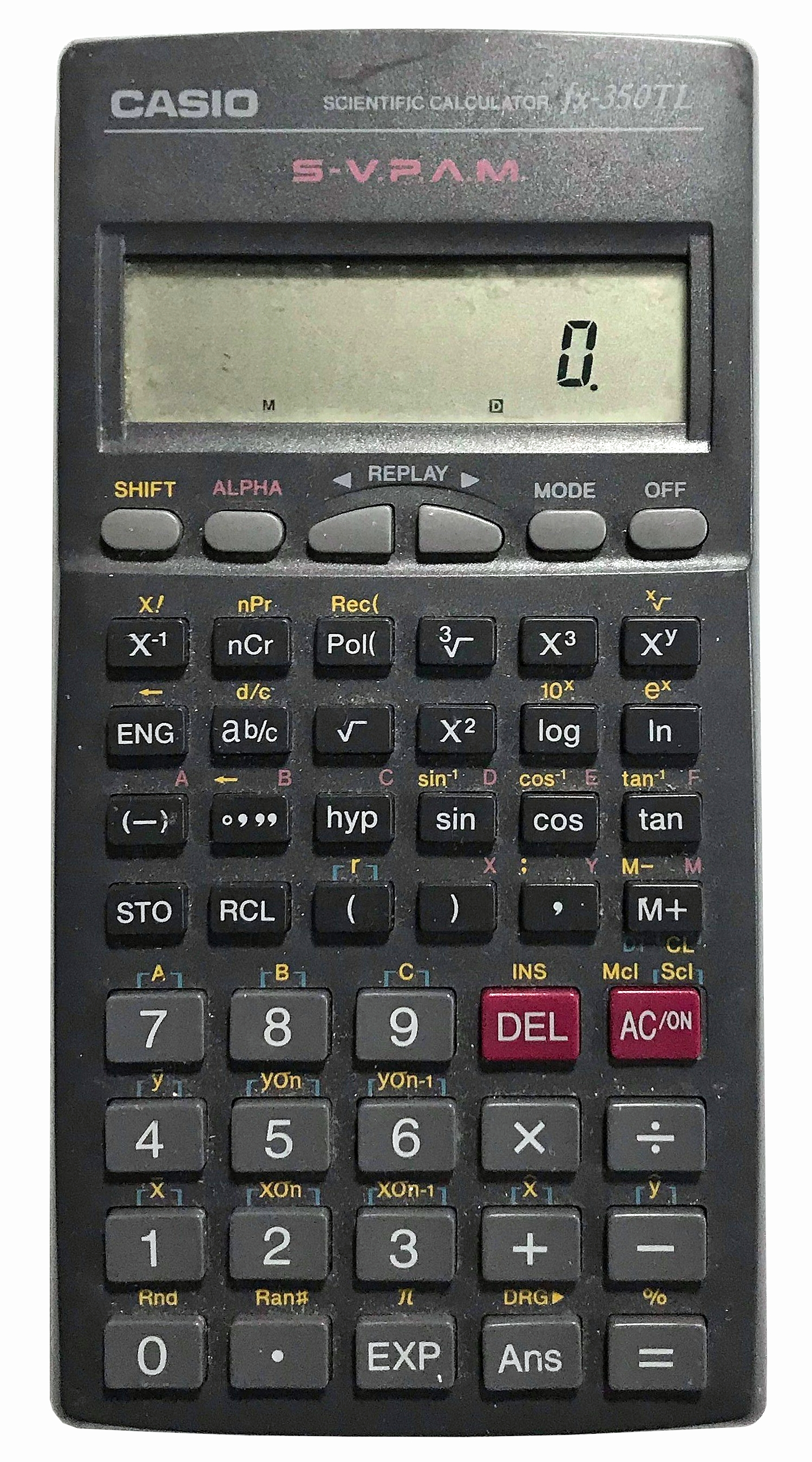
Casio FX-350TL

==== W-series ====
Changes to S-series calculators include:

- 2-line LCD featuring 5×6-dot matrix cells top line and 7-segment LCD bottom line that had been used in Casio fx-4500P programmable calculators (used 5×7-dot matrix cells).

Models:

- fx-991W, 570W, 115W, 100W, 115WA (c. 1998-99)
- fx-82TL, 83W, 85W, 85WA, 300W, 350TL, 83WA, 270W (c. 1998-99)

==== MS-series ====
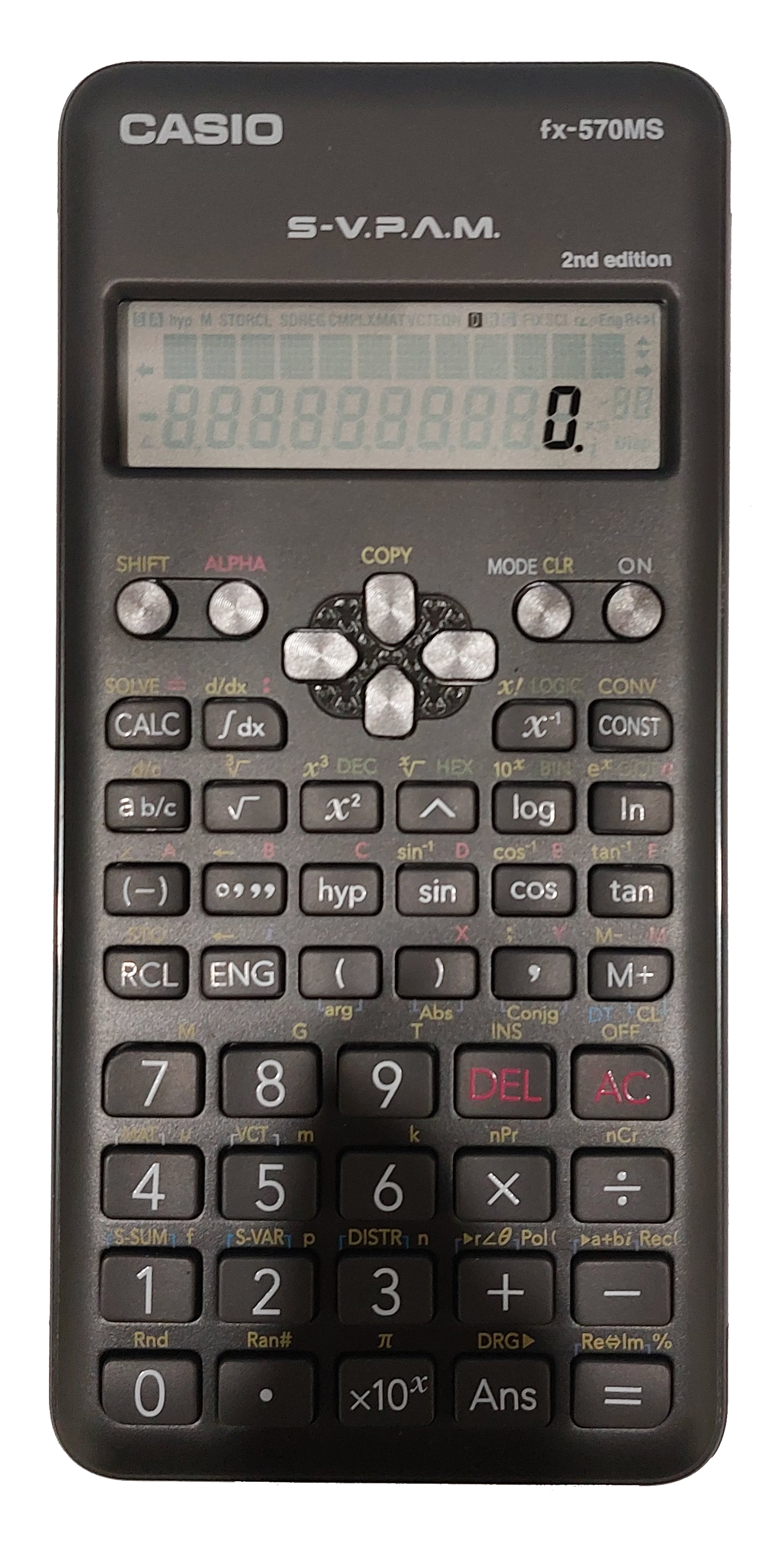
Casio fx-570MS 2nd Edition calculator. This is a revised version of the original fx-570MS.

Revised variants of W Series of calculators including new functions such as:

- Relocation of multiple functions into menus, formerly featured in Casio fx-5500LA, but function is selected by numeric keypad
- Multiple statement recall

Non-programmable models:

- fx-991MS, 570MS, 115MS, 100MS, 95MS, 85MS, 350MS, 82MS (early 2000s)
- fx-912MS (Japanese version of the fx-115MS)
- fx-300MS (U.S. model)
- OH-300MS (overhead projection model), fx-100AU (Australia specific)
- fx-500MS (Vietnam)
- fx-290 (Japan)
- fx-220 Plus (International)

Programmable models:

- fx-3650/3950P (International)
- fx-3650P II (International)
- fx-50F Plus (International)
- fx-50FH (Hong Kong)
- fx-50FH II (Hong Kong)
- fx-72F (Japan)

Second edition models:

- fx-82, 85, 95, 100, 350, 570, 991MS 2nd edition (2018) (International)
- fx-500MS 2nd edition (2018) (Vietnam)
- fx-300MS 2nd edition (Canada, U.S.)
- fx-300MS B 2nd edition (2025) (U.S.)

=== Natural Textbook Display ===
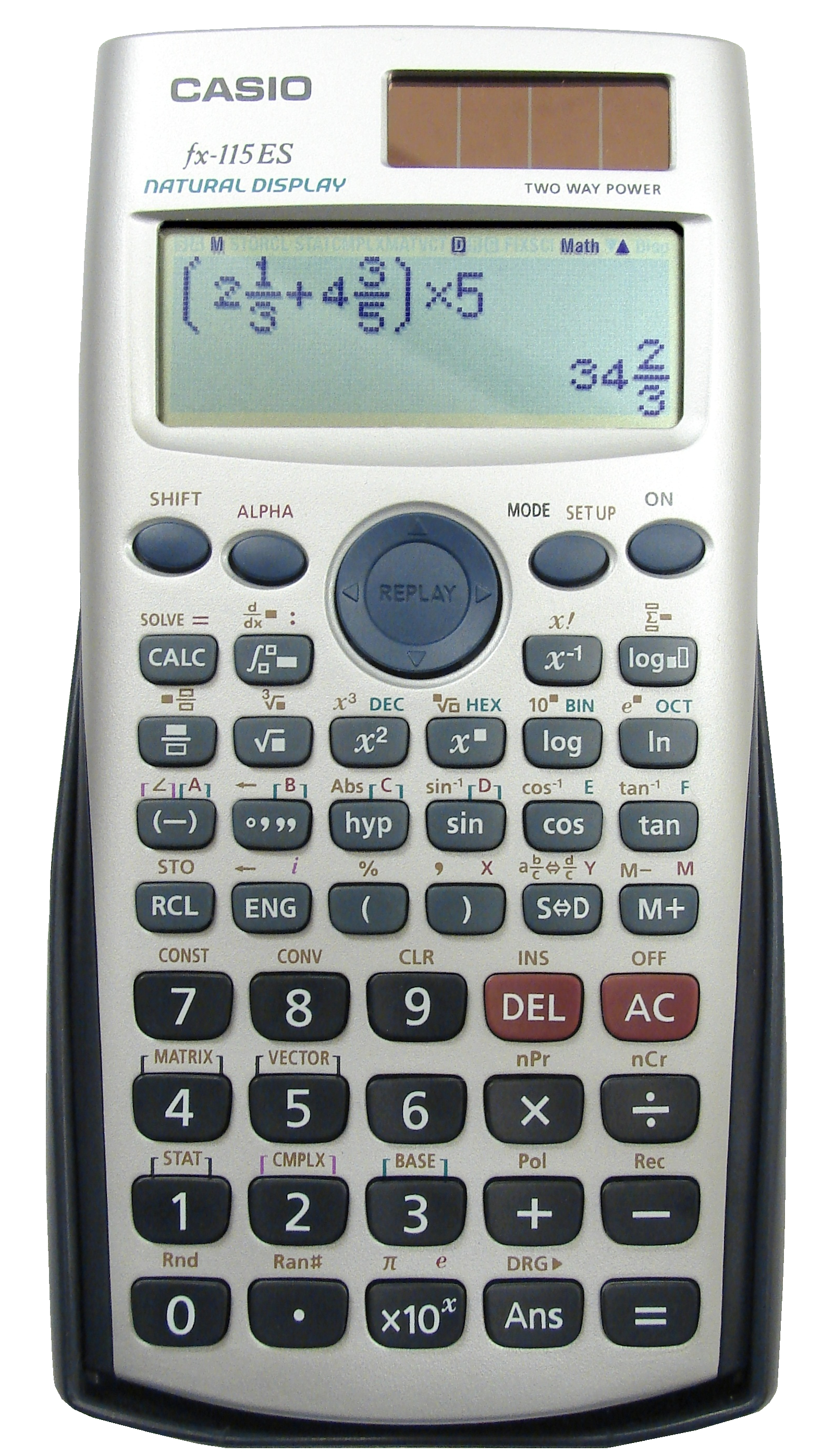
Casio fx-115ES scientific calculator with Natural Display. (also called "Natural V.P.A.M." in the updated version)

Revised version of the MS Series including the following changes:

- Multi-line 96×31 dot matrix displays, but character cells are connected by dots like graphing calculators
- The ability to display and edit mathematical formulas in more visual formats
- Revised design of function menu interface, formerly featured in Casio fx-4800P
- No engineering symbol (SI prefixes) input or display facility, which was available in certain MS, W, S series models (fx-100, 115, 570 and 991MS, W, S).
- Uses the nX-U8/100 based OKI ML610901(B) microcontroller

Model-specific features include:

- Numerical integration uses Gauss–Kronrod quadrature formula

Models:

- fx-991ES, 570ES, 115ES (c. 2004)
- fx-912ES, 370ES (Japan)
- fx-500ES, 350ES, 300ES, 85ES, 83ES, 82ES (c. 2004)
- OH-300ES (overhead projection model)
- FC-100/200V (financial functions)
- fx-5800P (Programmable)

=== Natural V.P.A.M. ===
Original Models:

- fx-82, 85, 95, 350, 570, 991ES Plus (c. 2008-09)
- fx-82AU Plus, fx-82AU Plus II, fx-100AU Plus (Australia)
- fx-82ES Plus A (China, simplified Chinese messages)
- fx-115, 300ES Plus, fx-55 Plus (U.S. and Europe)
- fx-991ES Plus C (Canadian version of fx-115ES Plus)
- fx-82, 85, 86, 87, 991DE Plus (Germany)
- fx-92 Collège 2D+ (France)
- fx-92B Collège 2D+ (Belgium)
- fx-83, 85GT Plus (EU, UK)
- fx-82, 991ZA Plus (South Africa)
- fx-82, 350, 570, 991LA Plus (Latin America)
- fx-373, 913, 573, 993ES (2008) (Japan)
- fx-375, 915, 995ES, fx-520AZ STUDY CAL (2012) (Japan)
- fx-500, 570VN Plus (Vietnam)
- fx-95, 96SG Plus (Singapore)
- fx-991ID Plus (Indonesia)
- OH-300ES Plus (overhead projection model)
- fx-FD10 Pro (International civil engineering model)

Second edition models:

- fx-82, 85, 95, 350, 570, 991ES Plus 2nd edition (2019) (International)
- fx-82AU Plus II 2nd edition, fx-100AU Plus 2nd edition (Australia)
- fx-82ES Plus A 2nd edition (China)
- fx-115, 300ES Plus 2nd edition (U.S.)
- fx-115, 300ES Plus B 2nd edition (2025), fx-55 Plus B 2nd edition (2026) (U.S.)
- fx-991ES Plus C 2nd edition (Canada)
- fx-87DE Plus 2nd edition (Germany)
- fx-375ES A (Japan)
- fx-82, 350, 570, 991LA Plus 2nd edition (Latin America)
- fx-570VN Plus 2nd edition (Vietnam)
- fx-82, 991ZA Plus II (South Africa)
- fx-991ID Plus 2nd edition (Indonesia)
- fx-9910NG Plus 2nd edition (Nigeria)
- FC-01A (2026) (China)

The CPU found in those models is based on the nX-U8/100 architecture.

=== ClassWiz (High-resolution Natural Textbook Display) ===
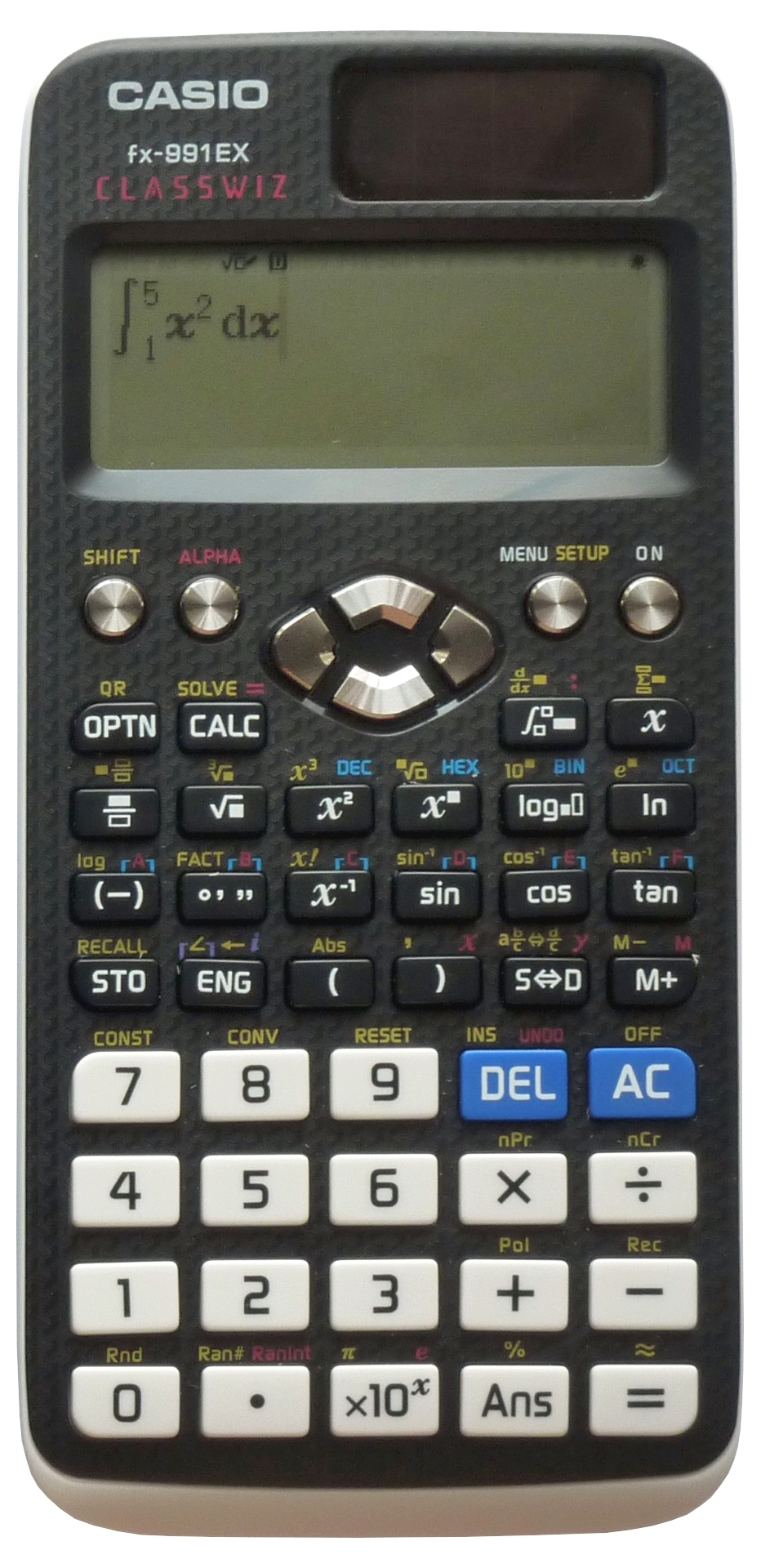
Casio fx-991EX ClassWiz (High-resolution Natural Textbook Display)

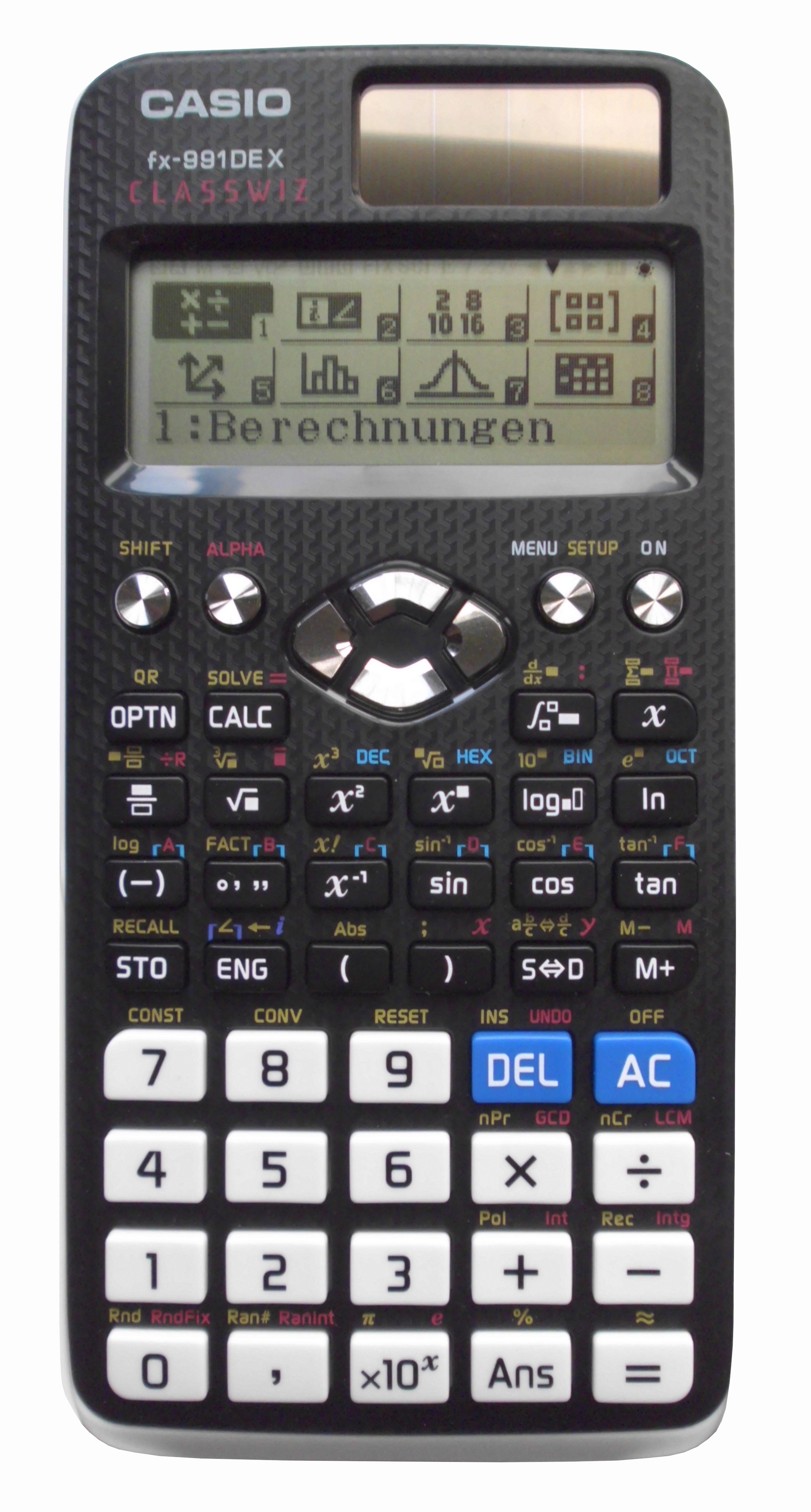
Casio fx-991DE X, the German model of the fx-991EX, which contains more functions than the fx-991EX

==== First version (X series) ====
Changes to the ES Plus series include:

- Standard 192×63 display
- Icon-based mode menu formerly used on Casio fx-9700GE graphing calculators
- Mode-specific functions are accessible via a unified function key as in fx-4800P
- Now uses the nX-U16/100 based ML620Q906

Model-specific features include:

- Scientific constants and conversion functions are grouped into categories
- Multilingual messages (excluding EX models and DE X models)
- QR code export (excluding CN X models, fx-580 VN X and fx-530AZ STUDY CAL)
- Multiline display supports up to 6 rows (excluding JP series, fx-530AZ STUDY CAL and fx-580VN X)
- Vector mode now supports maximum 4-variable vectors and 4 user-defined vector storage
- Matrix mode now supports maximum 4×4 matrices and 4 user-defined matrix storage
- New spreadsheet mode (excluding CN X and fx-580 VN X)
- Simultaneous linear equation solver supports up to 4 variables
- Polynomial equation solver supports up to 4th degree equations and inequalities
- Engineering symbols display and entry formerly found in MS, W, S, D-series calculators
- Periodic table mode with atomic weight information (fx-JP900, fx-991CE X and fx-991RS X only)
- New algorithm mode with Scratch-like script commands (fx-92+ Spéciale Collège only)

Models:

- fx-JP500, 700, 900 and fx-530AZ STUDY CAL (late 2014) (Japan)
- fx-82, 85, 350, 570, 991EX (early 2015) (International)
- fx-82, 85, 87, 991DE X (Germany)
- fx-82, 85, 350, 991CE X (Central Europe)
- fx-83, 85GT X (2019) (EU, UK)
- fx-92, 92+ Spéciale Collège (France)
- fx-92B Spéciale Collège (Belgium)
- fx-82, 350, 570, 991SP X I/II Iberia, fx-85SP X II Iberia (Portugal, Spain)
- fx-82, 350, 570, 991LA X (Latin America)
- fx-82, 95, 570, 991AR X (2015) (Middle East, Arabic Africa)
- fx-82, 95, 350, 991CN X 中文版 (Chinese Edition) (2014) (China)
- fx-580VN X (2018) (Vietnam)
- fx-97SG X (2018) (Singapore)
- fx-991RS X (Serbia)

==== Second version (CW series) ====
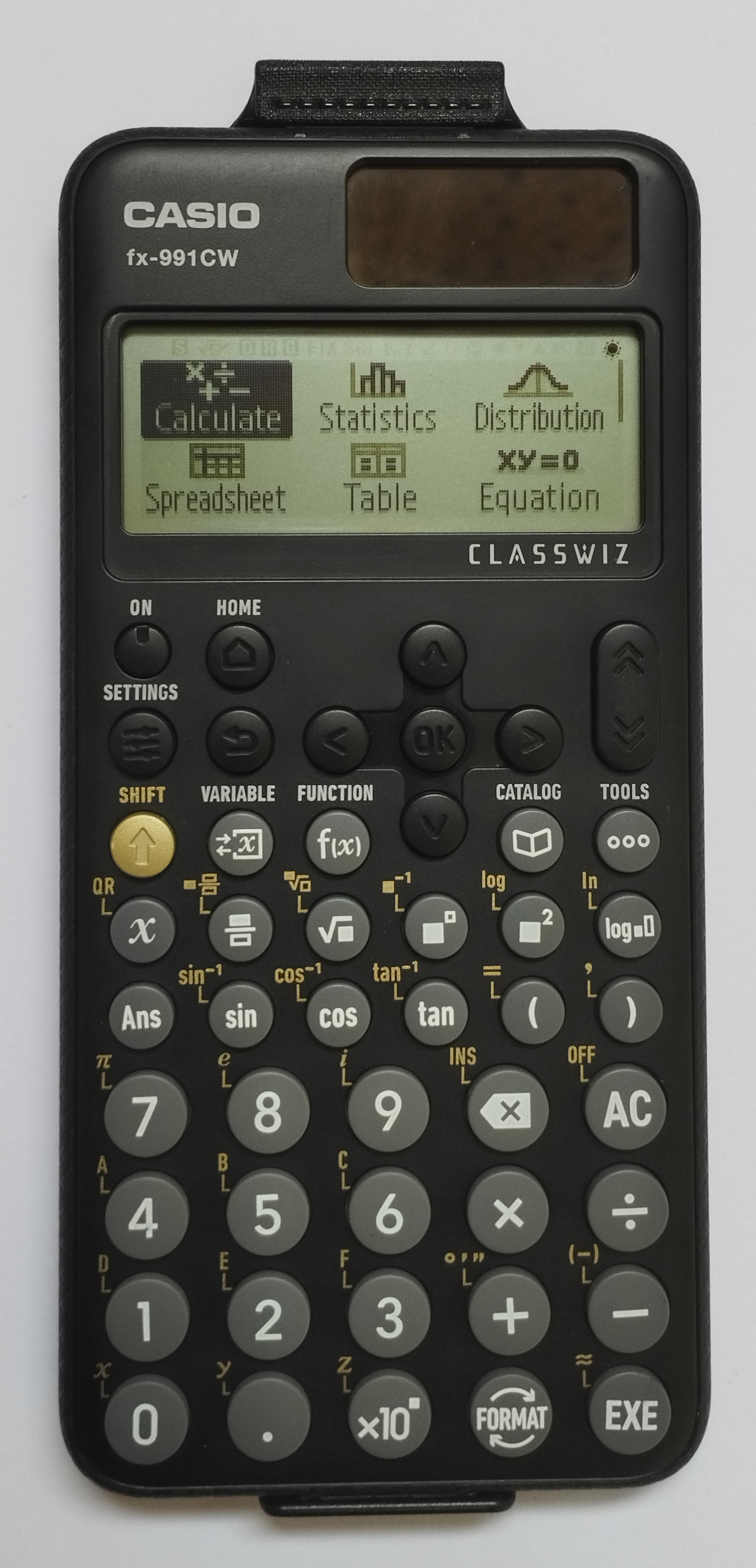
Casio fx-991CW, an international ClassWiz CW series model with built-in QR Code generation feature.

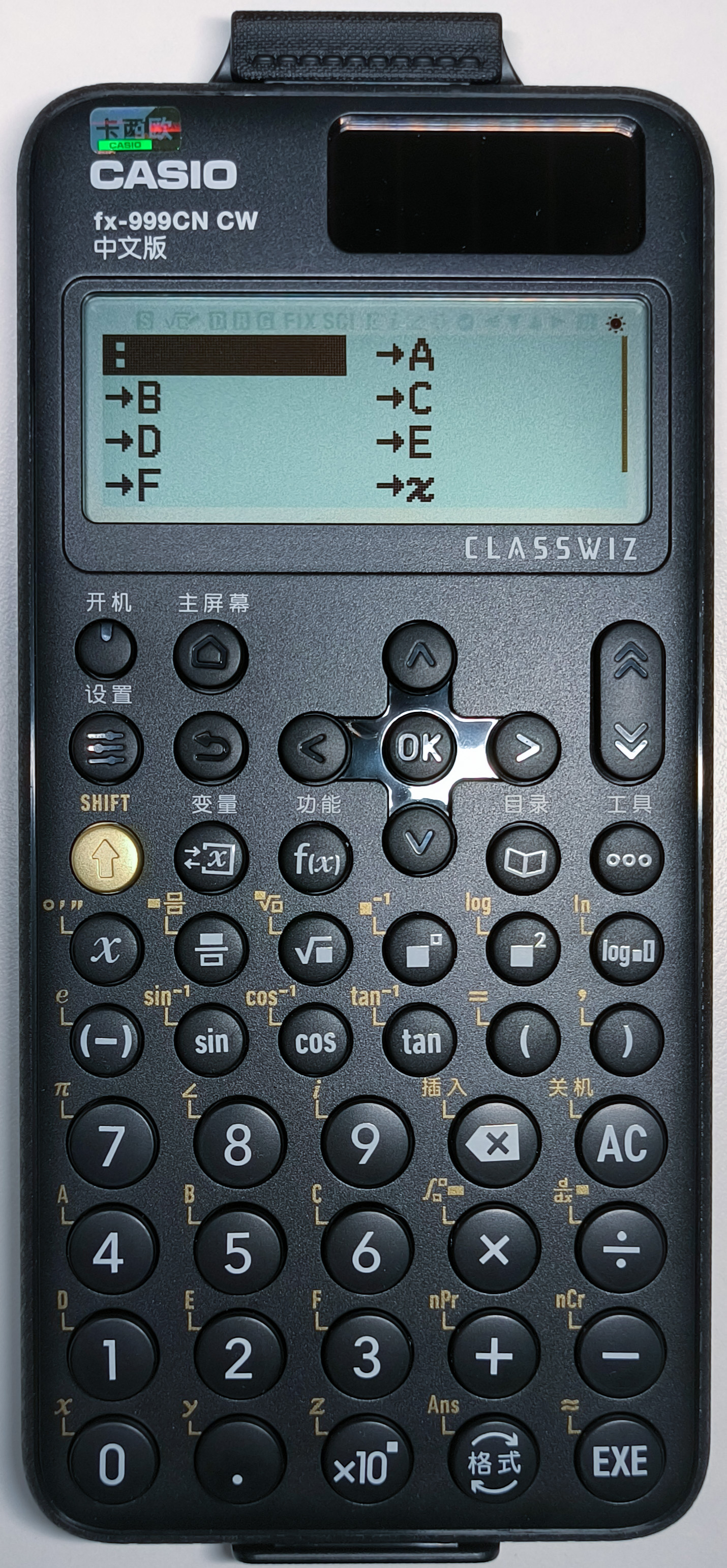
Casio fx-999CN CW, a Chinese ClassWiz CW series model, which retains the multi-statement and variable store characters function.

Changes to the ClassWiz X series include:

- The screen resolution remains at 192×63 pixels but now features 4-level grayscale display
- Cursor navigation completely replaces the previous method of using numeric keys to select menu options
- Added the Math Box application for mathematical exploration in most models
- Significant changes to the keyboard layout: the ALPHA key is removed; navigation keys for cursor movement, page flipping, returning, and confirmation (OK) are added. However, the total number of keys is reduced from 50 to 48
- Added Variable menu allows direct modification of variable values and supports storing results from the history log into variables
- Added Function menu enables the definition of two functions and their utilization across multiple applications
- Introduced CATALOG and TOOLS keys, where most functions and operations are accessed
- The M variable is removed, replaced by the z variable
- The ×10 key enters the multiplication symbol rather than the scientific notation symbol, altering calculation precedence compared to previous series
- The Statistics application now supports data sorting
- Except for CN CW models, variable store characters and multi-statement (i.e., colon ":") function are removed
- Improved calculation precision to 23 digits and increased floating-point precision to 60 bits
- The shutdown screen now includes the Casio logo and Casio Education Statement slogan, Boost your Curiosity. On the CN CW series, this slogan is additionally presented in Chinese as "激发你的好奇心"
- Now uses the nX-U16/100 based ML620Q909 with built-in BCD coprocessor
- The sliding protective cover is replaced with a snap-on cover

Model-specific features include:

- The previous Verify mode is no longer a standalone mode but dispersed across multiple modes, accessible within the Calculate, Complex, Table, and Equation applications
- The CALC function, present in most earlier models, has been removed from the majority of models except for the fx-880BTG and JP CW series
- The SOLVE function becomes a part of the Equation application
- When solving cubic equations, the capability to find local maximum and minimum values is supported
- Periodic table mode with atomic weight information (fx-JP900CW and fx-880BTG only)

Models:

- fx-880BTG (2022) (Vietnam)
- fx-82, 85, 350, 570, 991CW (2022) (International)
- fx-JP500CW, JP700CW, JP900CW and fx-550AZ Study CAL (2023) (Japan)
- fx-800DE Z(sample model), fx-800DE CW (2022), fx-82, 85, 87, 991DE CW, fx-810DE CW (2023) (Germany)
- fx-83, 85GT CW (EU, UK)
- fx-92 Collège, Graph Light (France)
- fx-92B Secondaire (Belgium)
- fx-82, 85, 991SP CW Iberia (Portugal, Spain)
- fx-82, 570, 991LA CW (Latin America)
- fx-82, 95, 350, 991, 999CN CW 中文版 (Chinese Edition) (2023) (China)
- fx-8200 AU (Australia)
- fx-82NL (Netherlands)

==== Revision of second version (CW 2nd edition series) ====
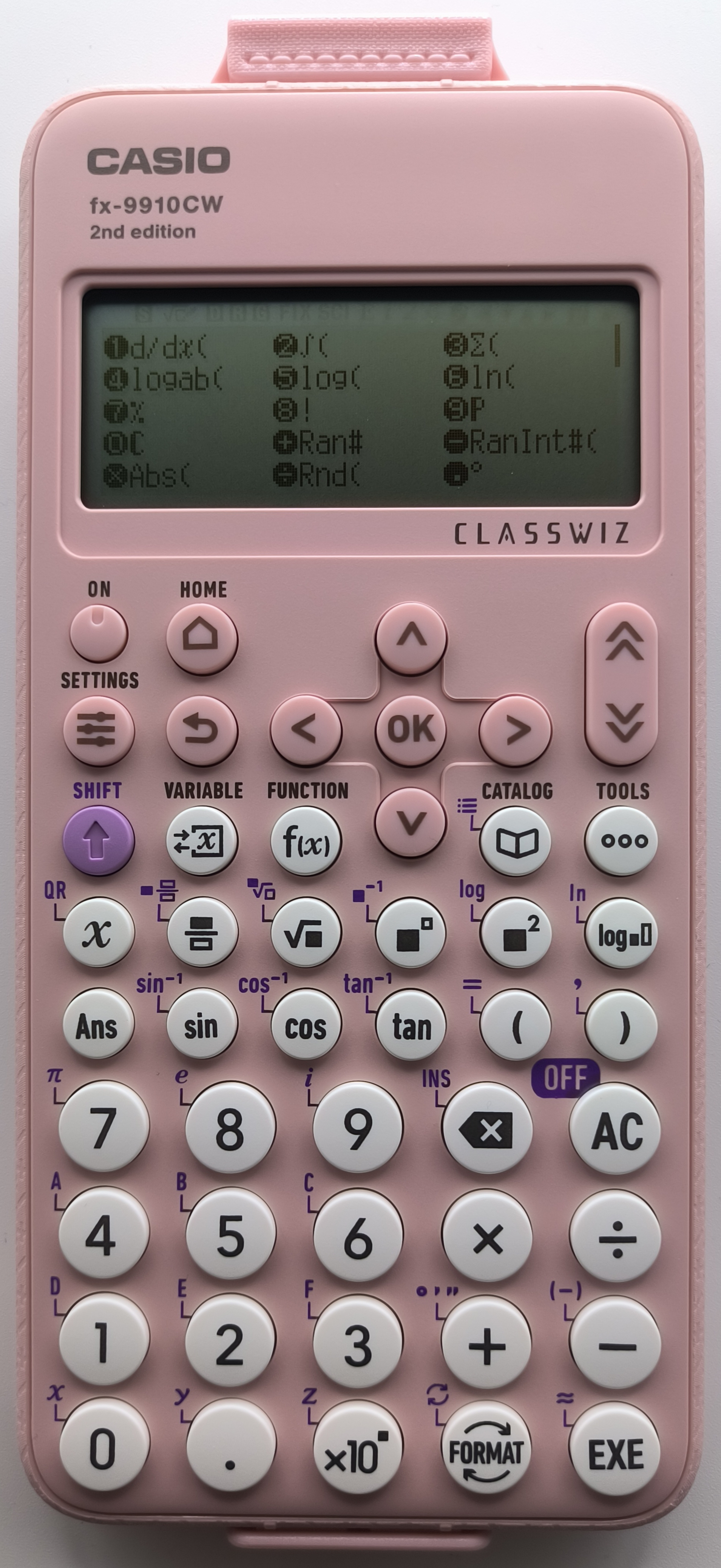
Casio fx-9910CW 2nd edition, as the first model in the fx-CW 2nd edition series, is released for the North American market

Key differences from the CW series include:

- Menu items can now be selected using number keys or symbol keys, such as plus (+), minus (−), multiply (×), divide (÷), and others
- The FORMAT button defaults to the same function as the former S<>D key, toggling between Standard and Decimal display formats
- The ×10 key defaults to scientific notation and automatically inserts brackets during calculations
- A new CATALOG List menu was introduced, displaying all functions and symbols in one menu
- Some typos in the messages have been corrected
- Navigation keys changed from engraved to printed labels, and the OFF label is highlighted in reverse colour

Model-specific features include:

- The order of the apps icon on the home screen varies depending on the model

Models:

- fx-570MY CW (2025) (Malaysia)
- fx-97SG CW (2025) (Singapore)
- fx-9910CW 2nd edition (2025) (Canada, U.S.)
- fx-991CW+ UK, fx-83, 85GT CW+ (2025) (UK)
- fx-82NL+ (2025) (Netherlands)
- fx-82, 95, 350, 991, 999CN CW II 中文版 (Chinese Edition) (2026) (China)
- fx-991, 999CN CW II Max 中文版 (Chinese Edition) (2026) (China)
- fx-92+ Collège, Graph Light+ (2026) (France)
- fx-82, 85, 350, 570, 991CW Plus (2026) (International)
- fx-8200 AU II (2026) (Australia)
- fx-880BTG Plus (2026) (Vietnam)
- fx-JP500CWS, JP700CWS, JP900CWS, 550AZS (2026) (Japan)

== See also ==
- Prettyprint
