= TI-84 Plus CE series =

Series of handheld calculators

TI-84 Plus CE
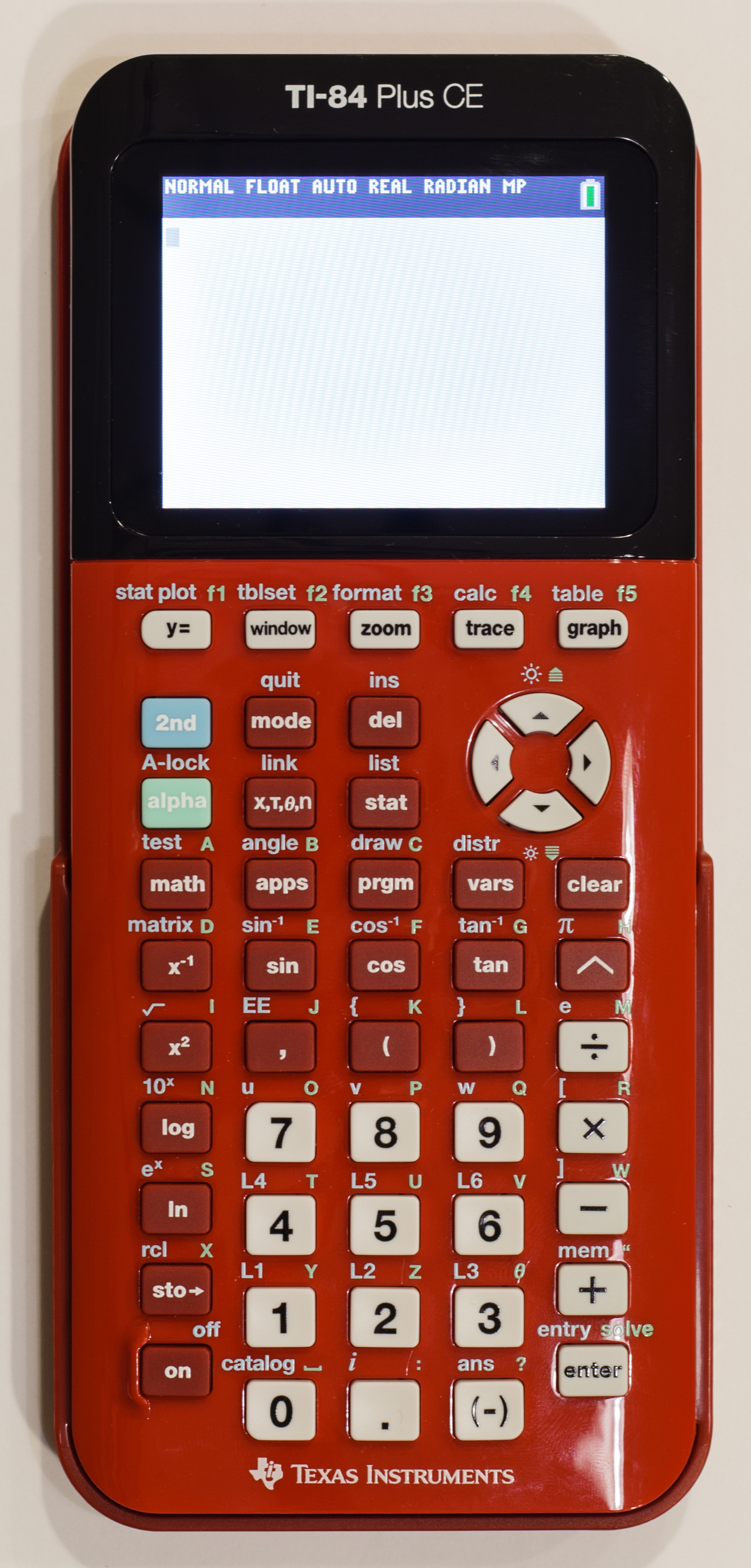
- Type: Graphing calculator
- Manufacturer: Texas Instruments
- Introduced: 2015
- Latest firmware: 5.8.5
- Predecessor: TI-84 Plus C Silver Edition
- Successor: TI-84 Plus CE Python

Calculator
- Entry mode: Algebraic Operating System

CPU
- Processor: Zilog eZ80
- Frequency: 48 MHz max.

Programming
- Programming language(s): TI-BASIC, eZ80 Assembly, C
- User memory: 256 KB RAM, of which 154 KB are user-accessible.
- Firmware memory: 4.0 MB Flash ROM (3.0 MB user-accessible)

Other
- Power supply: Rechargeable lithium-ion battery

TI-84 Plus CE Python
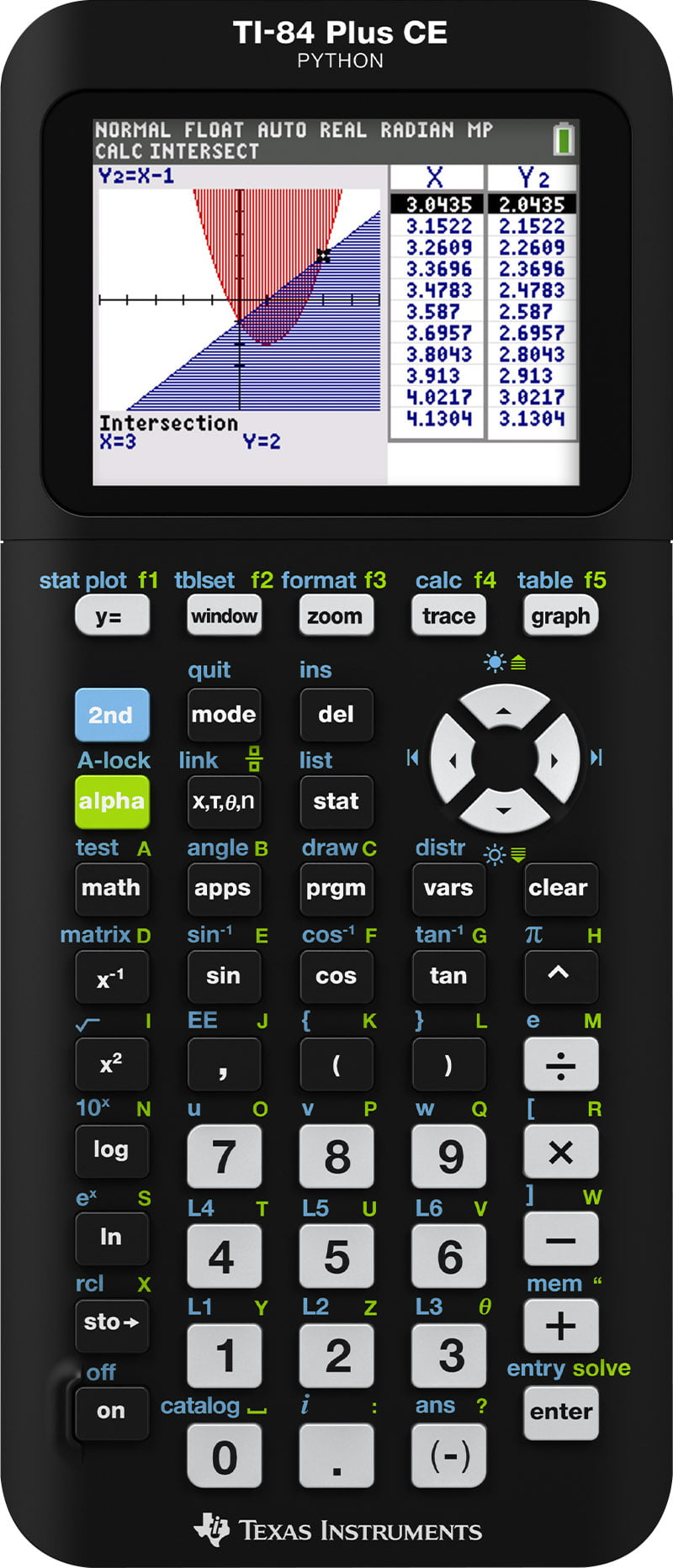
- Type: Graphing calculator
- Manufacturer: Texas Instruments
- Introduced: 2021
- Latest firmware: 5.8.5
- Predecessor: TI-84 Plus CE
- Successor: TI-84 Evo

Calculator
- Entry mode: Algebraic Operating System

CPU
- Processor: Zilog eZ80 and CircuitPython ARM processor
- Frequency: 48 MHz max.

Programming
- Programming language(s): TI-BASIC, eZ80 Assembly, C, Python
- User memory: 256 KB RAM, of which 154 KB are user-accessible.
- Firmware memory: 4.0 MB Flash ROM (3.0 MB user-accessible)

Other
- Power supply: Rechargeable lithium-ion battery

The TI-84 Plus CE series is a line of graphing calculators manufactured by Texas Instruments (TI). The original TI-84 Plus CE superseded the TI-84 Plus series upon its introduction in 2015; together with the TI-Nspire series, the TI-84 Plus CE is the previous generation flagship series of Texas Instruments graphing calculators.

In 2020, TI Education announced its decision to remove support for assembly and C programming on these calculators in response to a video posted on YouTube detailing how to bypass the test mode on OS version 5.2.2. Texas Instruments' response was widely considered unnecessary and led to anger from users. The changes are reflected in OS version 5.5.1 for the European models and OS version 5.5.5 for the US models.

== Editions ==
=== TI-84 Plus CE ===
The TI-84 Plus CE (known as the TI-83 Premium CE in France) was publicly previewed by Texas Instruments in January 2015, and released later that year.

Technologically, it is a significant improvement over the TI-84 Plus C Silver Edition (CSE); it retains the 320×240-pixel color screen, rechargeable battery, and key layout of the CSE, while removing the 2.5 mm "I/O" serial port. The CE also had six times the memory and was thrice as fast as its predecessor.

In addition, the RSA signing key length has been increased to 2048 bits, making infeasible previous efforts to unlock the calculator to unrestricted third-party software development. The calculator has 154 KB of user-accessible RAM and 3.0 MB of Archive memory. It uses the eZ80 processor from Zilog, which maintained "binary compatibility" with programs written for the older Z80.

The CE was introduced in multiple colors (Classic (black), Silver Linings, Radical Red, True Blue, Denim (navy blue), Lightning (light blue), Plum Pi (purple); Positively Pink (as of March 2015), Golden Ratio, and Bright White (as of June 2016) were added later), and further colors have since been released. Like the rest of the TI-84 Plus series, certain countries permit its use in examinations.

The calculator comes programmed with seven different languages (English, French, German, Dutch, Portuguese, Spanish, and Swedish).

=== TI-84 Plus CE-T ===
In 2016, the TI-84 Plus CE-T was released for the European educational market. The only significant difference from the CE model is the addition of an LED that blinks while the calculator is in Press-to-Test mode.

Hardware revisions M and later (which were manufactured starting May 2019) have a revamped PCB, improved architecture, and a new flash chip. Due to this change, these more recent revisions have seen a significant improvement in overall speed.

=== TI-84 Plus CE Python ===
The TI-84 Plus CE-T Python was released in 2021 and provides OS version 5.6 and above with the ability to program the calculator in Python and includes a preloaded bundle of applications. The Python implementation is extremely slow compared to NumWorks and HP calculators due to the use of an ARM coprocessor running CircuitPython, which communicates to the calculator via 115200 baud UART serial. In the North American market, the TI-84 Plus CE Python replaced the existing TI-84 Plus CE in 2021.

Around 2021, Texas Instruments removed the charging light (notably on the black model). In 2026, Texas Instruments discontinued the TI 84 CE Python, and moved all Python coding to the TI 84 Evo.

=== TI-84 Plus CE EZ-Spot ===
The TI-84 Plus CE EZ-Spot series, also known as the School editions and the School Property editions, are variants of TI-84 Plus CE series calculators produced by Texas Instruments and only made available for schools to purchase. This special yellow-tinted design was produced in an effort to combat theft. Owners can buy other interchangeable colored slide-cases online. Only the TI-84 Plus CE and TI-84 Plus CE Python have had a School Property variant, and not the regional models like the TI-83 Premium CE or TI-84 Plus CE-T (regardless of Python).

=== TI-84 Evo ===
The TI-84 Evo was released in April 2026, after previously having been leaked via online retailers in January of that year. The device includes USB-C charging (a first for the TI-8x lineup), and a new processor that is three times faster than the one in the TI-84 Plus CE. Unlike the TI-84 Plus CE Python, which used a Zilog eZ80-based processor with an Arm Cortex-M0 co-processor to support CircuitPython, the Evo is built around a single 156Mhz Arm Cortex CPU with native CircuitPython support. The software has been updated to allow using the full screen for graphing, increasing the graphing area by 50%, but graphing speed appears to be artificially software limited to emulate the behavior of previous devices. The keyboard is a simplified version of that in previous calculators, and there is a new home screen with icons for various functions that were previously accessed through dedicated buttons (similar to the NumWorks graphing calculator, Casio fx-CG series, and Texas Instruments' own TI-Nspire CX II).

== Software ==
=== Programs and applications ===
The TI-84 Plus CE can run a wide variety of both official and community-made software, including video games, math programs, educational programs, graphics programs, and even some internet-based programs (operating through the link port). Applications, often called flash applications, are a type of program stored in the calculator's ROM. Applications tend to be more complex than programs.

The TI-84 Plus CE supports TI-BASIC, eZ80 assembly language and C (with external tools and software); the Python version of the TI-84 Plus CE supports Python. The calculator can be connected to a USB keyboard to help with programming. TI-84 Plus CE models running operating systems newer than OS 5.6 can no longer run eZ80 assembly or C programs.

=== Operating systems ===
There have been many operating system releases for the TI-84 Plus CE; the following list is all the documented OS releases for the TI-84 Plus CE only. (not including TI-83 Premium CE releases or the prototype releases):

- 5.0.0 (April 2015)
- 5.0.1 (April 2015)
- 5.1.0 (August 2015)
- 5.1.5 (January 2016)
- 5.2.0 (June 2016)
- 5.2.1 (September 2016)
- 5.2.2 (March 2017)
- 5.3.0 (September 2017)
- 5.3.1 (March 2018)
- 5.3.6 (March 2019)
- 5.4.0 (June 2019)
- 5.4.1 (March 2020)
- 5.5.5 (June 2020)
- 5.6.0 (July 2020)
- 5.6.1 (February 2021)
- 5.7.0 (November 2021)
- 5.7.2 (June 2022)
- 5.8.0 (June 2022)
- 5.8.1 (December 2023)
- 5.8.2 (November 2024)
- 5.8.3 (April 2025)
- 5.8.4 (October 2025)
- 5.8.5 (April 2026, latest)

Controversially, assembly and C support was removed in OS 5.5.5, released in 2020. Texas Instruments stated that this change was made to "prioritize learning for students" and to reduce the risk of cheating in examinations. In addition to this, they blocked the ability to downgrade to any version below OS 5.5.5 to make sure that assembly or C support could not be added back to the calculator.

An exploit (commonly considered a jailbreak, despite not modifying firmware) called arTIfiCE, was released four months later; it restored the ability to run assembly and C code. The arTIfiCE exploit was patched in OS 5.8.3. However, this exploit came back within the span of a couple months after the patch with the release of arTIfiCE v2.0, restoring assembly support for the CE models, until it was patched again in OS 5.8.5. In September 2026, arTIfiCE v3 was released, targetting OS 5.8.5 specifically. This does not affect the monochrome or CSE variants of the TI-84 Plus, whose last firmware updates were in 2011 and 2014 respectively.

The TI-84 Plus CE(-T) Python Edition supports using CircuitPython, a Python 3 variant, developed by Adafruit. On the latest versions of the python edition models, there are 7 modules. These modules are: math, random, time, and 4 custom modules from TI named: ti_system, ti_plotlib, ti_hub, and ti_rover, which are used for controlling the calculator, software, or other external devices made by TI.

== Technical specifications ==
- CPU: Zilog eZ80 – 48 MHz
- Flash ROM: 4.0MB, 3.0MB user-accessible
- RAM: 154 KB user-accessible out of 256 KB total
- Display:
  - Text: -16-×|8| characters (normal font)
  - Graphics:
    - Plus C/CE: 320 × 240-pixel screen, 140 DPI, 16-bit color. Drawing pixel range: 0-164 × 0–264.
- USB: USB Mini-AB
- Power:
  - Rechargeable lithium-ion battery
- Integrated programming languages: TI-BASIC and machine code. Assembly requires a computer with an eZ80 assembler or an on-calc assembler. Includes Python for the Python edition models.

== TI-Connect CE ==
Texas Instruments produces TI-Connect CE, which is compatible with all variants of the TI-84 Plus CE. It supports installing programs, loading bundles of files, multi-device syncing and exam mode deployment, along with the ability to send OS updates to multiple calculators at the same time, and a built-in IDE for TI-BASIC programming.

== See also ==
- Texas Instruments
- Comparison of Texas Instruments graphing calculators
- TI-BASIC
