= TI-84 Plus series =

Line of graphing calculators produced by Texas Instruments

- The original TI-84 Plus calculator
- Type: Graphing calculator
- Manufacturer: Texas Instruments
- Introduced: 2004
- Latest firmware: TI-84 Plus and Silver Edition: 2.55MP; C Silver Edition: 4.2
- Predecessor: TI-83 Plus series
- Successor: TI-84 Plus CE series

Calculator
- Entry mode: Expression-based

CPU
- Processor: Zilog Z80
- Frequency: 6/15 MHz

Programming
- Programming language(s): TI-BASIC, Z80 Assembly
- User memory: TI-84 Plus and Silver Edition: 24 KB; C Silver Edition: 21 KB
- Firmware memory: TI-84 Plus: 480 KB; Silver Edition: 1.5 MB; C Silver Edition: 3.5 MB

Other
- Power supply: TI-84 Plus and Silver Edition: 4 AAA batteries and 1 SR44 button cell C Silver Edition: Lithium-ion rechargeable battery

The TI-84 Plus series is a line of graphing calculators produced by Texas Instruments. They are ubiquitous in the American education system, and have historically been considered the de facto standard in grade school math. The series has also amassed a significant hobbyist following, along with a large library of community-developed applications, for its support of assembly language and TI-BASIC programs.

The family was superseded by the TI-84 Plus CE series in 2015; of the original series, only the TI-84 Plus is still in production, the Silver Edition and C Silver Edition having been discontinued that same year. However, they remain popular in the United States, with the TI-84 Plus being issued by schools more than 20 years after its introduction.

Beginning from around 2011, the series has received media attention from technology publications due to hobbyist app releases for the platform, such as an unofficial ChatGPT client, a web browser, and a neural network. In recent years, however, the TI-84 Plus has been increasingly criticized for its antiquated technology and poor value for money, with critics claiming that its continued sale is a result of Texas Instruments' calculator monopoly.

== Editions ==
=== TI-84 Plus ===
The original TI-84 Plus (Note: The use of "Plus" in the calculator's name is because the TI-84 Plus directly replaced the TI-83 Plus, which was itself a more powerful version of the TI-83. Unlike its predecessor, however, the TI-84 Plus does not have an "original" or "non-Plus" variant.) was released in 2004 as an upgrade to the TI-83 Plus. Its keyboard layout and user interface are identical to that of its predecessor, and it is backwards compatible with older TI-BASIC programs. Despite this, it has significantly improved hardware; its CPU, the Zilog Z80, is 2.5 times as fast as the one in the TI-83 Plus, its display is of a higher contrast, and it has three times as much flash memory.

The TI-84 Plus introduced a real-time clock and a mini-USB data transfer port. The USB port is USB On-The-Go compliant, allowing the TI-84 Plus to connect to—and exchange data with—another calculator; Texas Instruments calls this feature Communication Link. The TI-84 Plus can also connect to a computer to transfer programs and files using Texas Instruments' proprietary program, TI-Connect.

An all-white variant of the TI-84 Plus was introduced in 2023. Currently, the calculator is still in production and issued by schools around the United States, required by some institutions, and seen as the standard option by many; critics argue that the enduring prevalence of the TI-84 Plus—which is considerably less powerful than a smartphone, yet still costs more than some—has hindered innovation in calculator technology and is a result of monopoly. They also claim that Texas Instruments exploits this by keeping prices at a level roughly twice that of competing calculators.

=== TI-84 Plus Silver Edition ===
TI-84 Plus Silver Edition

The TI-84 Plus Silver Edition (SE) was introduced on January 7, 2004 as an upgrade to the TI-83 Plus Silver Edition. It features 24 KB of user-available RAM; the calculator technically has 128 KB—48 KB in newer revisions—but the operating system was never updated to utilize it. It has 1.5 MB of user-accessible ROM, more than three times the 480 KB in the TI-84 Plus. It came preloaded with 30 applications.

The Silver Edition has interchangeable faceplates, and new, colored faceplates were available for purchase at Texas Instruments' online store. It was discontinued in 2015, making the TI-84 Plus the only currently produced calculator in the series.

=== TI-84 Plus C Silver Edition ===
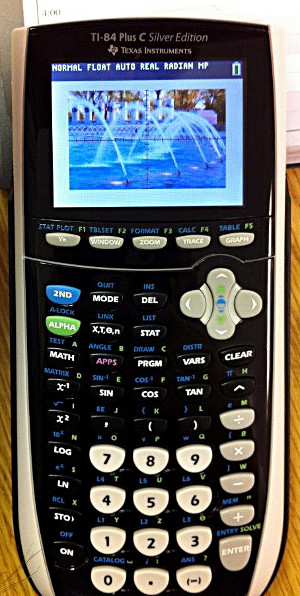
TI 84 Plus C Silver Edition

The TI-84 Plus C Silver Edition (C SE) was released in 2013 as the first Z80-based Texas Instruments graphing calculator with a color screen.

It introduced a 320-by-240 pixel color screen, a modified version of the TI-84 Plus's 2.55MP operating system, and a removable 1200 mAh rechargeable lithium-ion battery. It was praised for its high-resolution color screen, which added new capabilities such as the ability to graph multiple simultaneous functions in different colors. The C Silver Edition would not be Texas Instruments' last foray into color-screen calculators for the student market; the TI-84 Plus CE was introduced—with an upgraded CPU—two years later. The C Silver Edition was discontinued a few months after the launch of the CE.

== Software ==
=== Programs and applications ===
The TI-84 Plus series supports both programs and applications. Programs are written by the user; some programs, like those written in TI-BASIC, are interpreted during execution and can thus be edited directly on the calculator. Applications (also called Flash applications (Note: The "Flash" in "Flash application" does not refer to Adobe Flash; it signifies that the application uses Texas Instruments' FLASH technology.)) are stored in the calculator's ROM; these tend to be more complex than standard programs, and are usually from Texas Instruments themselves. Officially, two programming languages are supported: TI-BASIC and Z80 assembly. However, there are unofficial, community-developed languages—such as the Axe Parser—made specifically for the TI-84 Plus series.

The series has a significant hobbyist following, and a wide variety of official and community-made software has been developed for it over the years. These include video games, math programs, educational tools, and graphing software. In 2011, an unofficial web browser, Gossamer, was released for the platform, and in recent years, programmers have created internet-based programs like a ChatGPT client, graphical ray-casting software, and a neural network that incorporates primitive artificial intelligence. These developments have attracted the attention of technology publications.

=== Operating systems ===
There have been eight operating system releases for the monochrome-display calculators in the series, which include the TI-84 Plus, the Silver Edition, and their respective variants. There have been two releases for the C Silver Edition. TI-84 Plus series calculators can run custom user interface shells, such as MirageOS and Doors CS. In addition, calculators with an older bootloader can run custom operating systems like KnightOS.

==== Monochrome ====
Version	Release date	Release information
2.21	March 2004	First release for the TI-84 Plus series. Added several new TI-BASIC commands.
2.22	August 2004	
2.30	December 2004	Added discontinuity detection when graphing asymptotes. Also added four new TI-BASIC commands.
2.40	November 2005	Added the Press-To-Test feature, which allows an exam supervisor to temporarily disable the execution of most programs and applications.
2.41	May 2006	
2.43	December 2007	
2.53MP	February 2010	Introduced support for pretty-printing equations, called MathPrint.
2.55MP	January 2011	Added two new statistics-related TI-BASIC commands. Final release for the TI-84 Plus and the Silver Edition.

==== C Silver Edition ====
Version	Release date	Release information
4.0	April 2013	First release for the C Silver Edition; not compatible with previous calculators in the series.
4.2	January 2014	Final release for the C Silver Edition.

=== Linking software ===
Texas Instruments develops the TI-Connect linking software, which hosts a number of sub-programs (called software tools) to manage TI-84 Plus series calculators.

Tool	Function
ScreenCapture	Capture and save a still of a calculator's screen.
DeviceInformation	Generate an information report of a calculator, which includes details such as its model, available storage, and installed applications.
DataEditor	Modify variables on a calculator, such as numbers, lists, and matrixes.
DeviceExplorer	Copy files to and from a calculator, install programs and applications, and create file groups.
OS Downloader	Upgrade or downgrade the operating system on a calculator.
Backup/Restore	Create and restore complete calculator backups, including RAM, applications, and flash memory.

Texas Instruments' newer program for the TI-84 Plus CE series calculators, TI-Connect CE, is backwards-compatible with the TI-84 Plus series; it can be used in place of TI-Connect. TI-Connect is compatible with Windows XP and above, while TI-Connect CE is compatible with Windows 10 and above.

There are multiple third-party linking programs compatible with the TI-84 Plus series; most were developed for archaic platforms like the Commodore Amiga, the Atari, and MS-DOS, and cannot be run on modern computers. However, one of these programs—known as TiLP (Note: TiLP stands for "TiLP is a Linking Program", which is a recursive acronym. The original TiLP (known as TiLP-1) was supplanted by TiLP II (also known as TiLP-2) around mid-2006. TiLP, as used here, refers to TiLP II.)—is more recent and supports Windows, macOS, and Linux.

== Technical specifications ==
Model	Processor	Flash ROM	RAM	Display	I/O	Battery	Weight	Dimensions	Ref.
TI-84 Plus	Zilog Z80 6/15 MHz, overclockable to 26 Mhz	480 KB 29LV800	24 KB	Toshiba T6K04, monochrome, 96x64 pixels, 16x8 characters	Mini USB, 96 kbps link port	4x AAA, 1x SR44 35 mA backup	7.4 ounces	7.5 x 3.3 x 0.85 inches	
TI-84 Plus Silver Edition	Zilog Z80 6/15 MHz, overclockable to 26 Mhz	1.5 MB 29LV160	128 KB, later decreased to 48 KB. 24 KB user accessible.	Toshiba T6K04, monochrome, 96x64 pixels, 16x8 characters	Mini USB, 96 kbps link port	4x AAA, 1x SR44 35 mA backup	7.6 ounces	7.5 x 3.3 x 0.85 inches	
TI-84 Plus C Silver Edition	Zilog Z80 6/15 MHz	3.5MB MX29LV320	21 KB	Ilitek ILI9335, color, 320x240 pixels, 140 DPI	Mini USB, 96 kbps link port	3.7L1200SP lithium-ion rechargeable	7.4 ounces	7.5 x 3.3 x 0.85 inches	

== Equipment ==
Texas Instruments has released a variety of equipment for its graphing calculators. Even though only the Calculator-Based Ranger 2 features USB connectivity, the TI-84 Plus series can connect to older Texas Instruments equipment using its serial I/O link port. Since the newer TI-84 Plus CE series does not have this port, it is not compatible with most of this equipment.

=== ViewScreen ===
The ViewScreen is an LCD panel and projection system that mirrors the display of a calculator; it was first introduced in 1993, and there have been several models since. Unlike most other equipment, it uses a ViewScreen port (only present on ViewScreen calculator variants) instead of the I/O link port. However, there is a dongle—the Presentation Link Adapter—that allows a standard TI-84 Plus to connect to a ViewScreen panel.

=== Presenter ===
The Presenter, introduced in 2003, is an alternative piece of calculator screen display equipment; instead of using a proprietary display panel and overhead projection system like the ViewScreen, the Presenter connects to an existing display device—such as a television or interactive whiteboard—using either an RF modulator or composite video input. Since it uses the same communication protocol as the ViewScreen, it is compatible with both the Presentation Link Adapter and ViewScreen variants of the TI-84 Plus.

=== Calculator-Based Laboratory ===
The Calculator-Based Laboratory (CBL), a general purpose data acquisition unit, was introduced in 1994. It collects information from several types of modular sensors by Vernier, Inc.—at a speed of up to 10,000 data points per second—and sends it to a calculator via link cable, which records and graphs the data. It also features a display and basic firmware of its own for standalone data processing. In 1999, the CBL was superseded by the CBL 2, which lacked a display for standalone use but introduced flash memory and increased the single-channel sample rate to 50,000 data points per second.

=== Calculator-Based Ranger ===
The Calculator-Based Ranger (CBR), introduced in 1997, is, like the CBL, a data acquisition unit, but features a single built-in sonic sensor instead of multiple unique modular ones. It measures distances by emitting and receiving an ultrasonic pulse, and then calculating the distance traveled by performing a speed-of-sound calculation using its microprocessor. It then stores this information in a list—which can contain up to 512 data points—and transfers that to a calculator via link cable. The CBR was replaced by the CBR 2 in 2004, which added a USB port for faster data transfer with the TI-84 Plus series.

=== Orion Talking Graphing Calculator ===
The Orion TI-84 Plus Talking Graphing Calculator is a detachable accessory for the TI-84 Plus produced by Texas Instruments in collaboration with Orbit Research and the American Printing House for the Blind. It adds general accessibility features—such as speech navigation—to the TI-84 Plus, and is able to read out the contents of the calculator's display using speech synthesis. It uses its own power source, a rechargeable battery, instead of drawing power from the calculator itself.

== Variants ==
=== TI-84 Plus EZ-Spot ===
The TI-84 Plus EZ-Spot series, also known as the School editions and the School Property editions, are variants of TI-84 Plus series calculators produced by Texas Instruments and only made available for schools to purchase. They have the words "School Property" emblazoned on their faceplate and are accented yellow; this easily distinguishable design was chosen in an effort to prevent theft. The TI-84 Plus Silver Edition and C Silver Edition also have EZ-Spot variants.

=== TI-84 Plus Silver Edition VSC ===
The TI-84 Plus Silver Edition ViewScreen Calculator, also known as the TI-84 Plus Silver Edition VSC, is a variant of the TI-84 Plus Silver Edition intended for educational use. It has a display output that allows it to connect to a ViewScreen.

=== TI-84 Plus T ===
The TI-84 Plus T is a variant of the TI-84 Plus; it was introduced in 2015 by Texas Instruments, exclusive to the Netherlands. This variant is similar to the rest of the series, but features an LED to indicate whether or not the calculator is in press-to-test mode. The hardware of the TI-84 Plus T is similar to the TI-84 Plus Silver Edition, but the TI-84 Plus T is no longer able to run the assembler.

=== TI-84 Pocket.fr and Plus Pocket SE ===
The TI-84 Pocket.fr (Note: This is the only mentioned TI-84 Plus series calculator to not have the Plus in its name. However, it does still have flash memory, and is still considered part of the TI-84 Plus family due to it being a TI-84 Plus derivative.) was introduced in 2011 as a miniaturized variant of the TI-84 Plus for the French market. It was the first region-specific calculator in the TI-84 Plus series. A year later, the TI-84 Plus Pocket SE was introduced as a miniaturized variant of the TI-84 Plus Silver Edition for the Asian market.

== Gallery ==
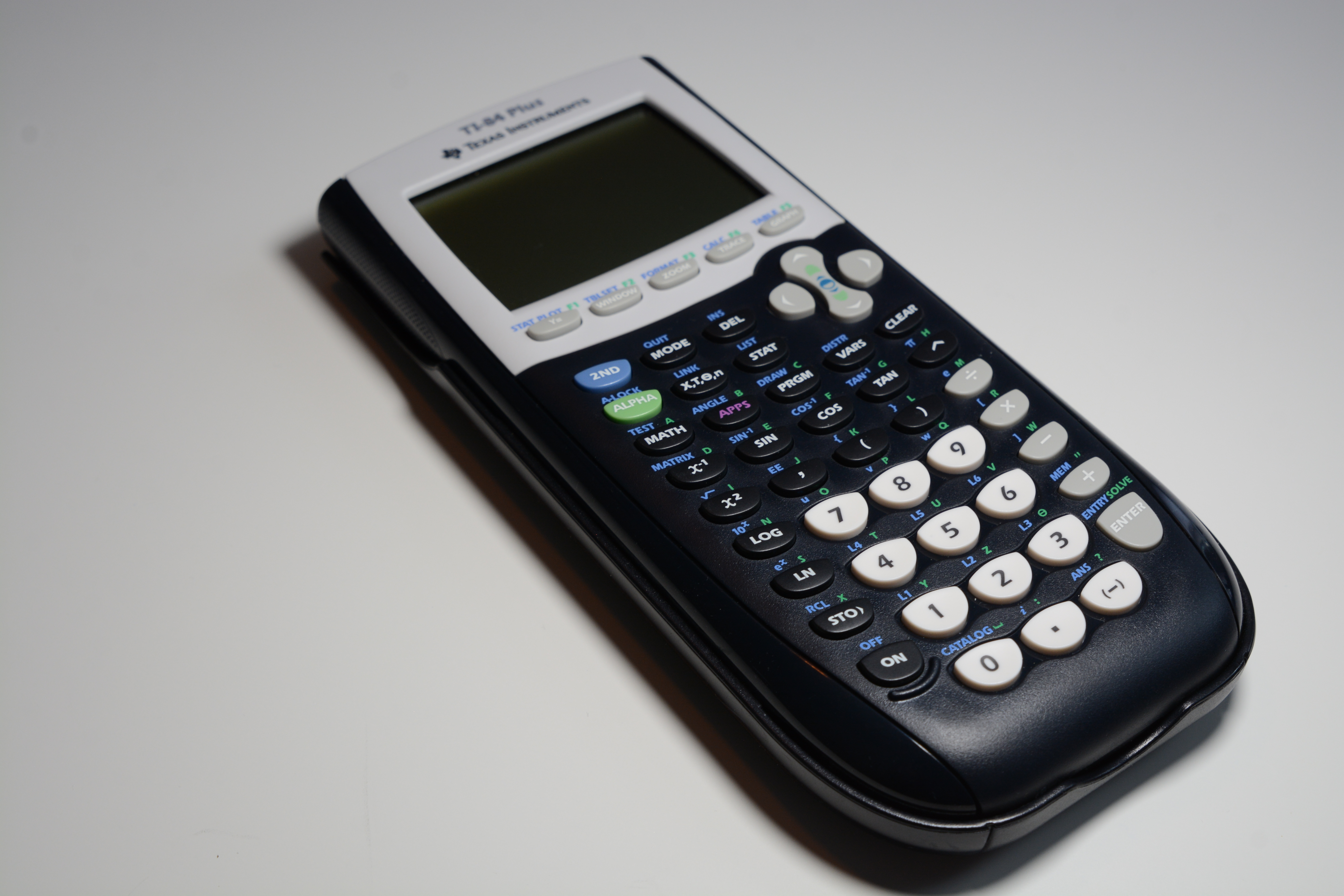
TI-84 Plus

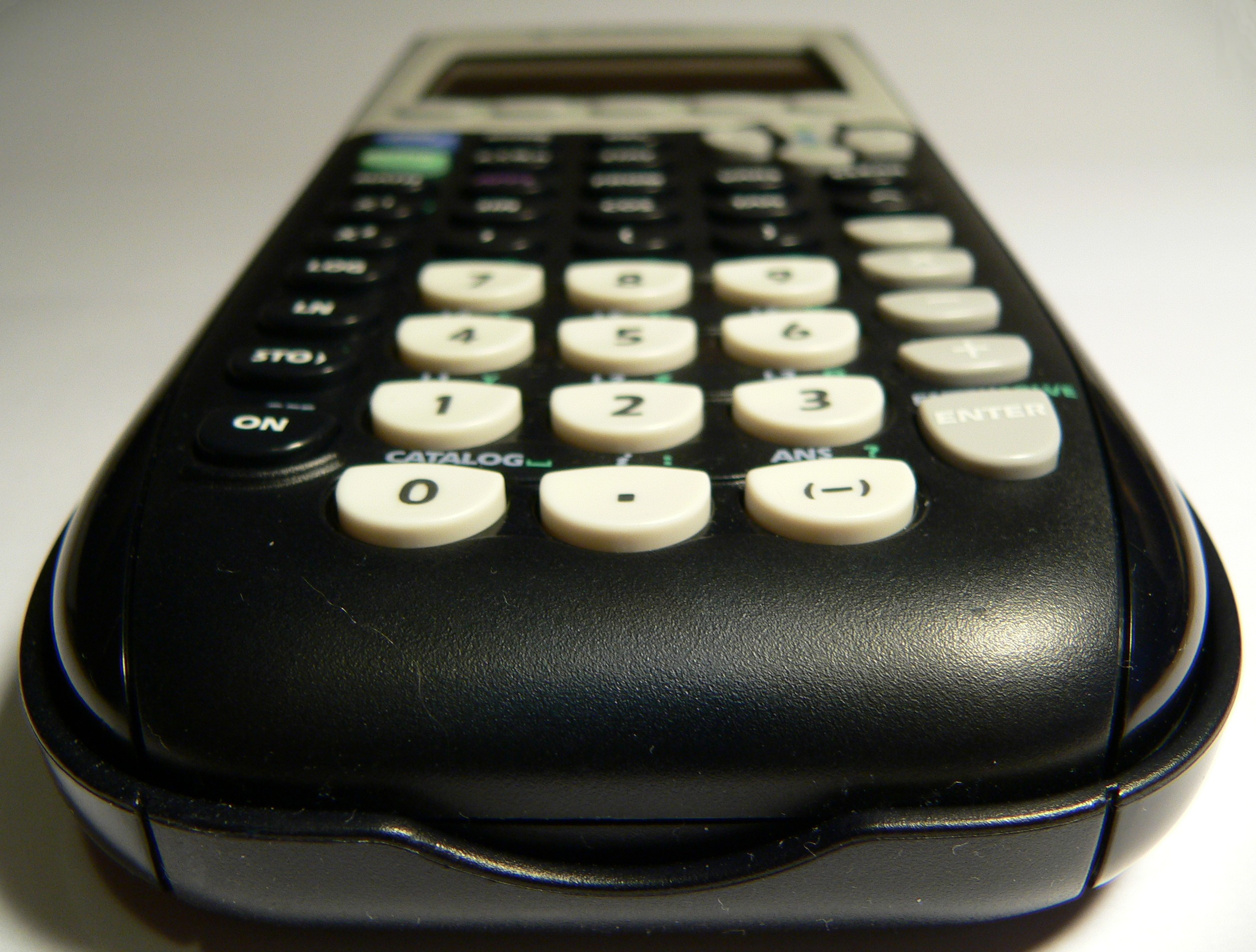
TI-84 Plus at an angle

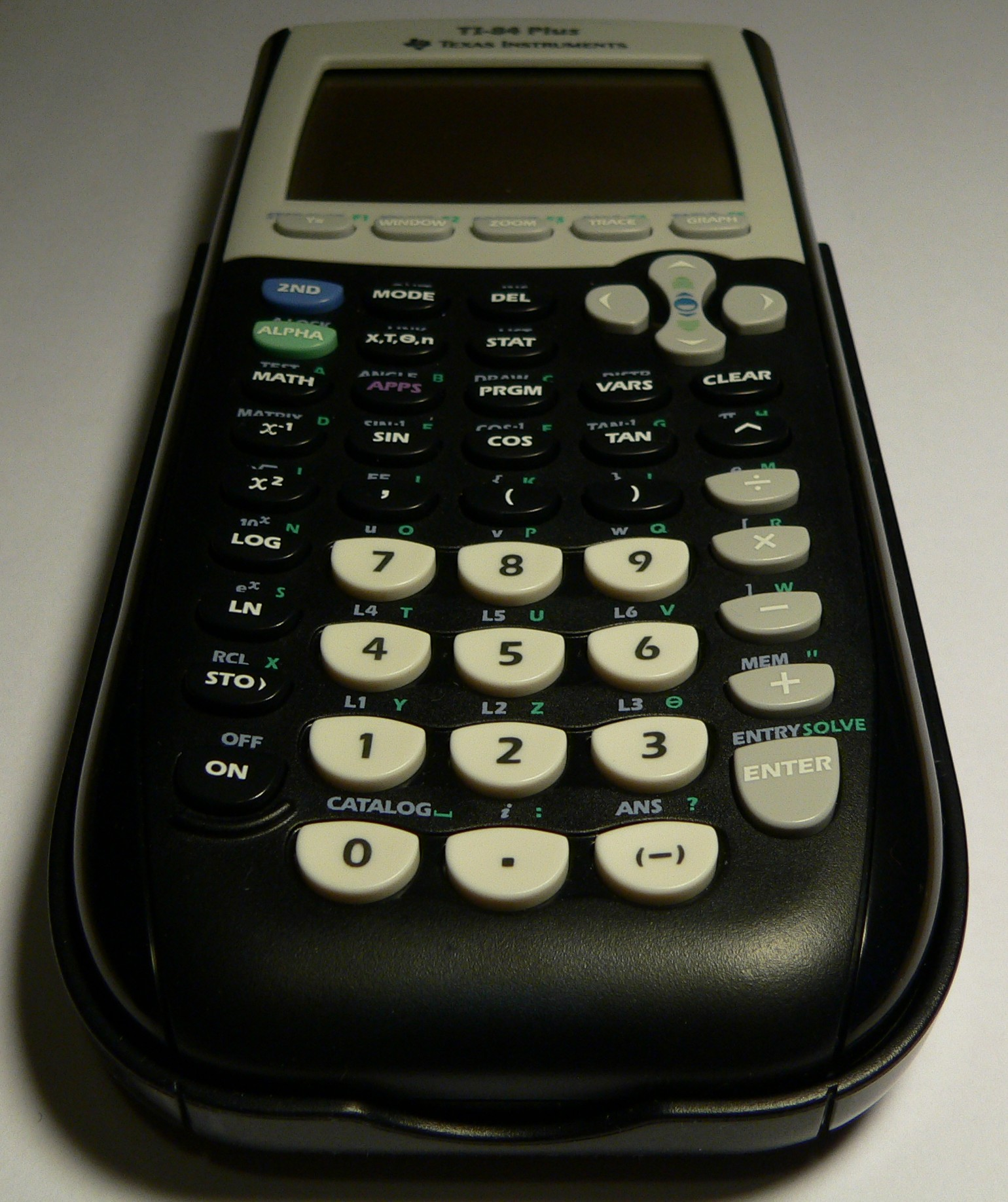
TI-84 Plus at another angle

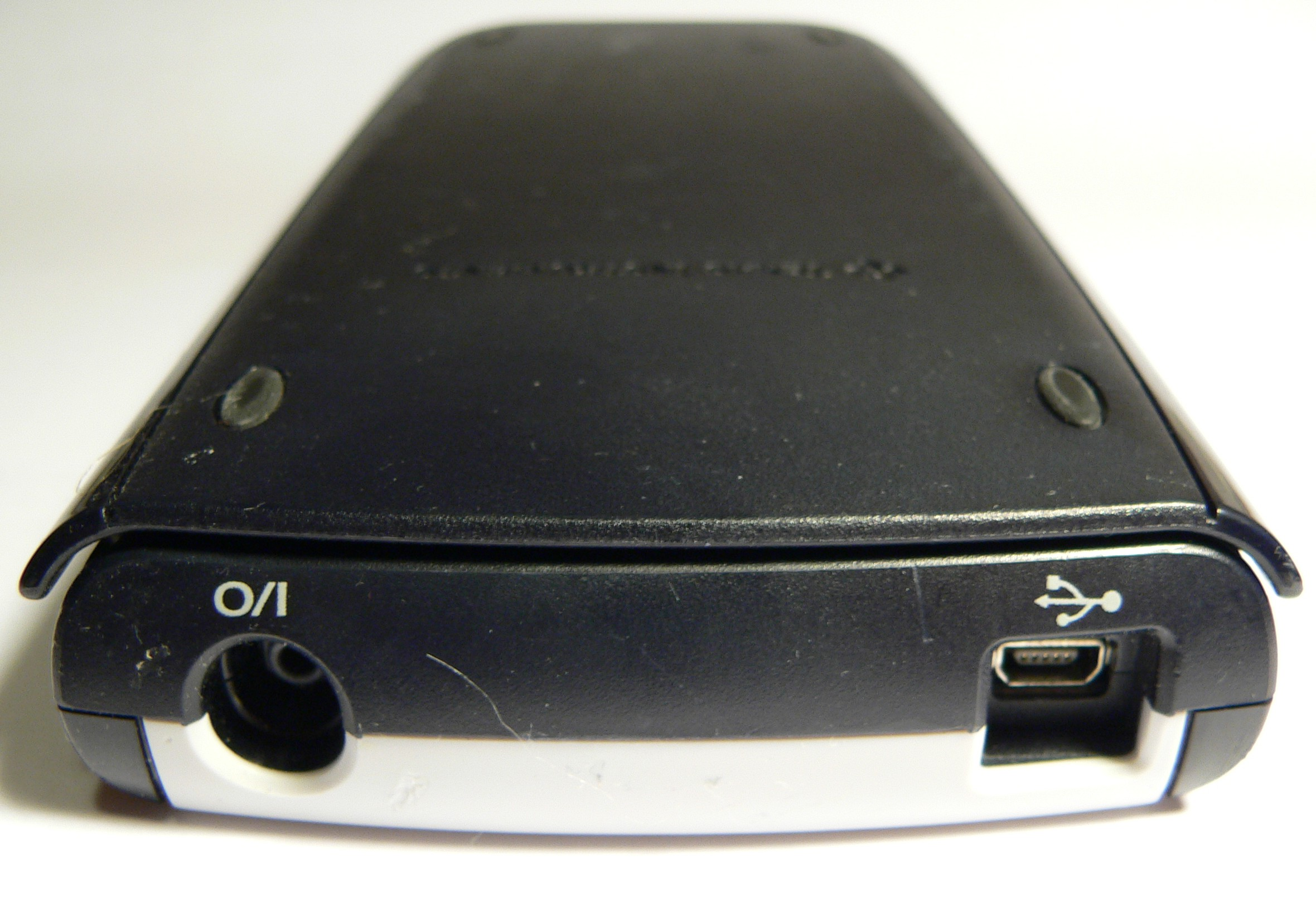
Link port and USB port

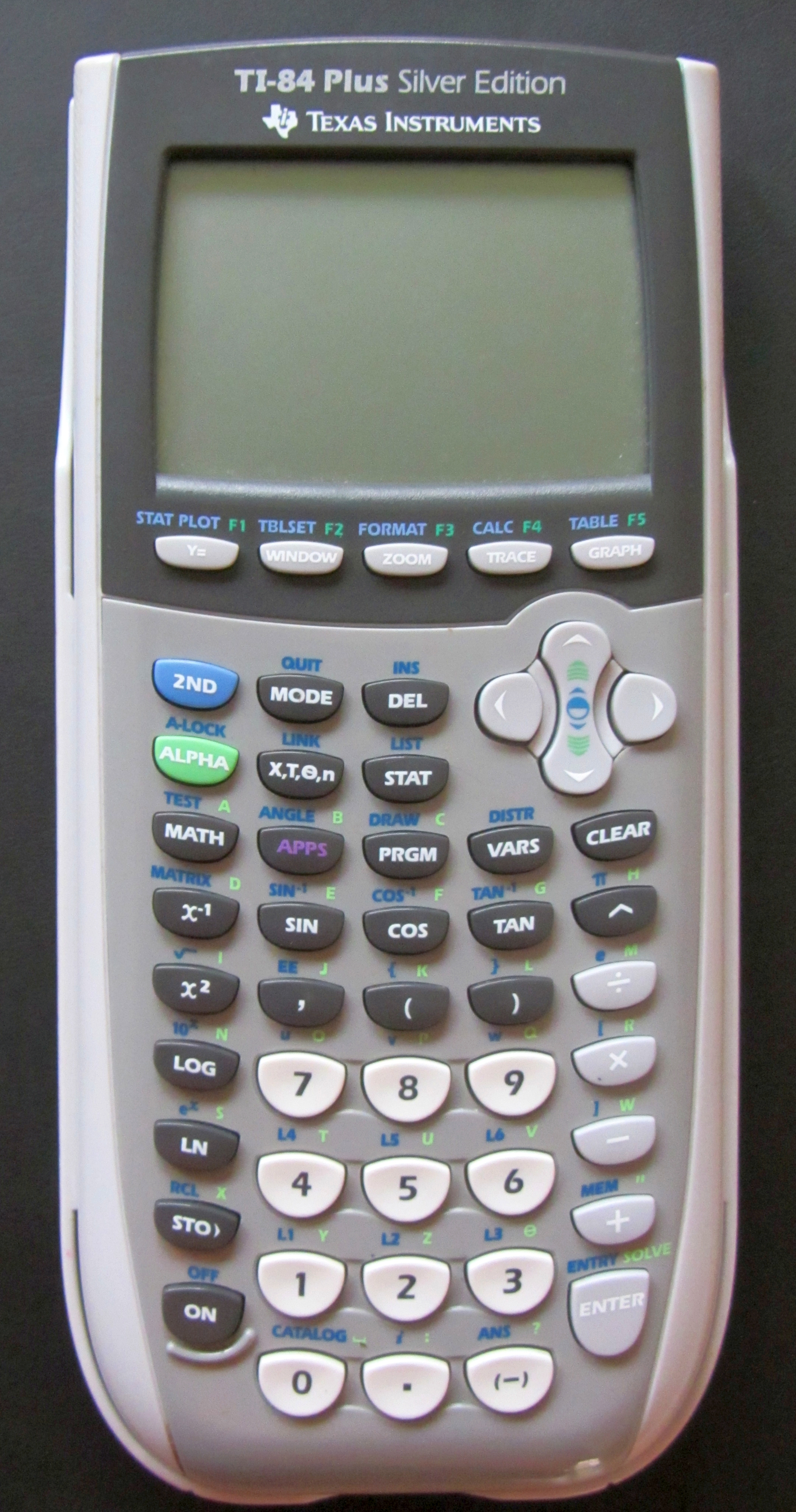
TI-84 Plus Silver Edition

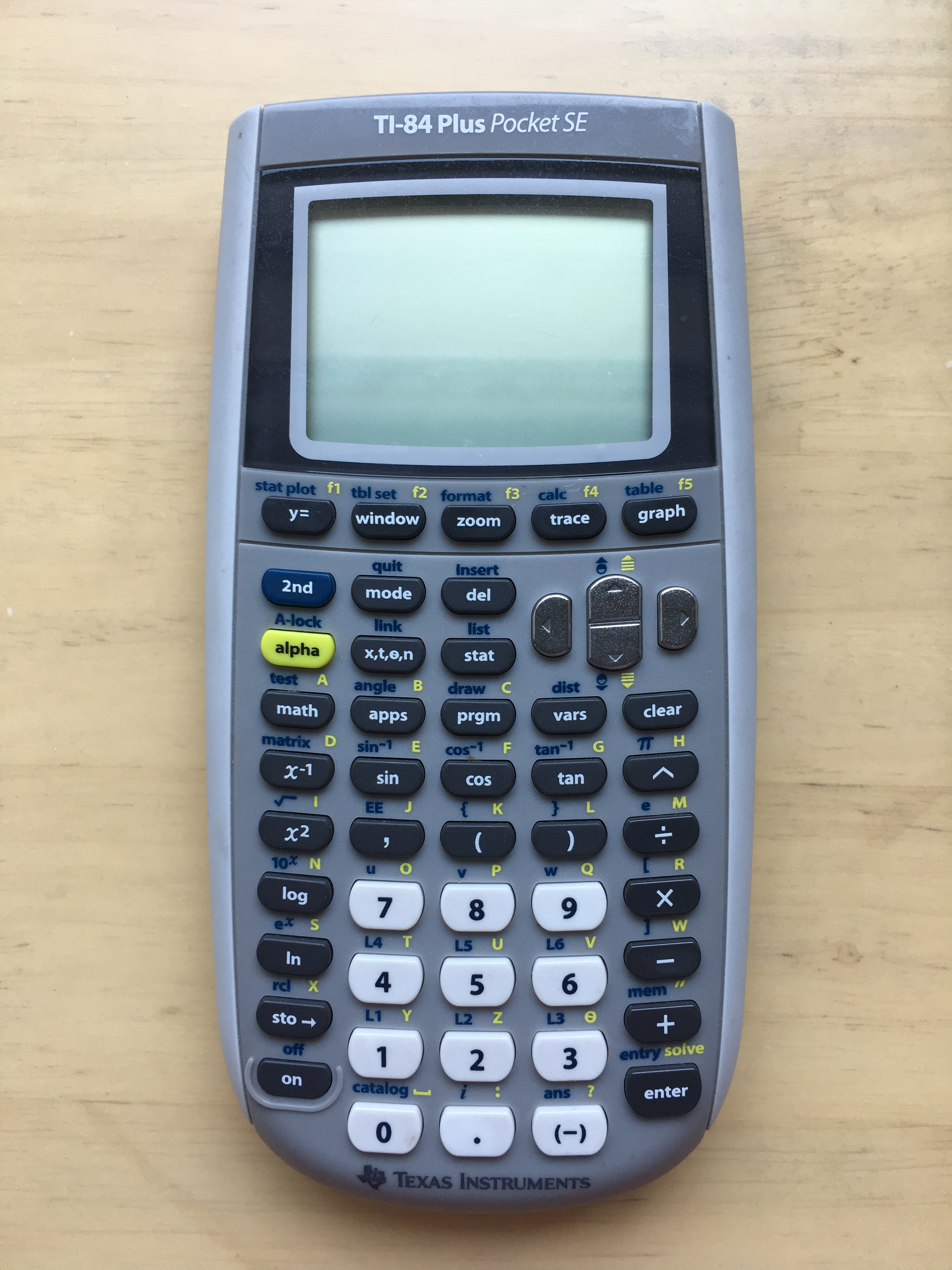
TI-84 Plus Pocket SE

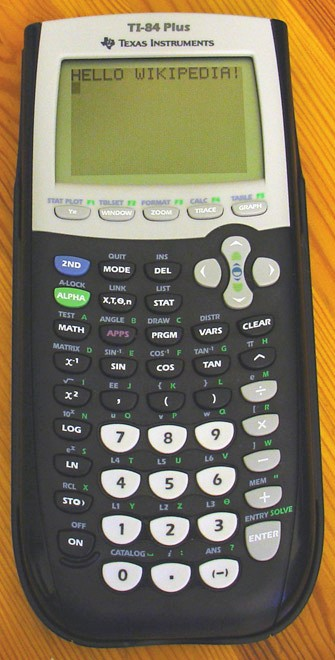
Display with "Hello Wikipedia!"

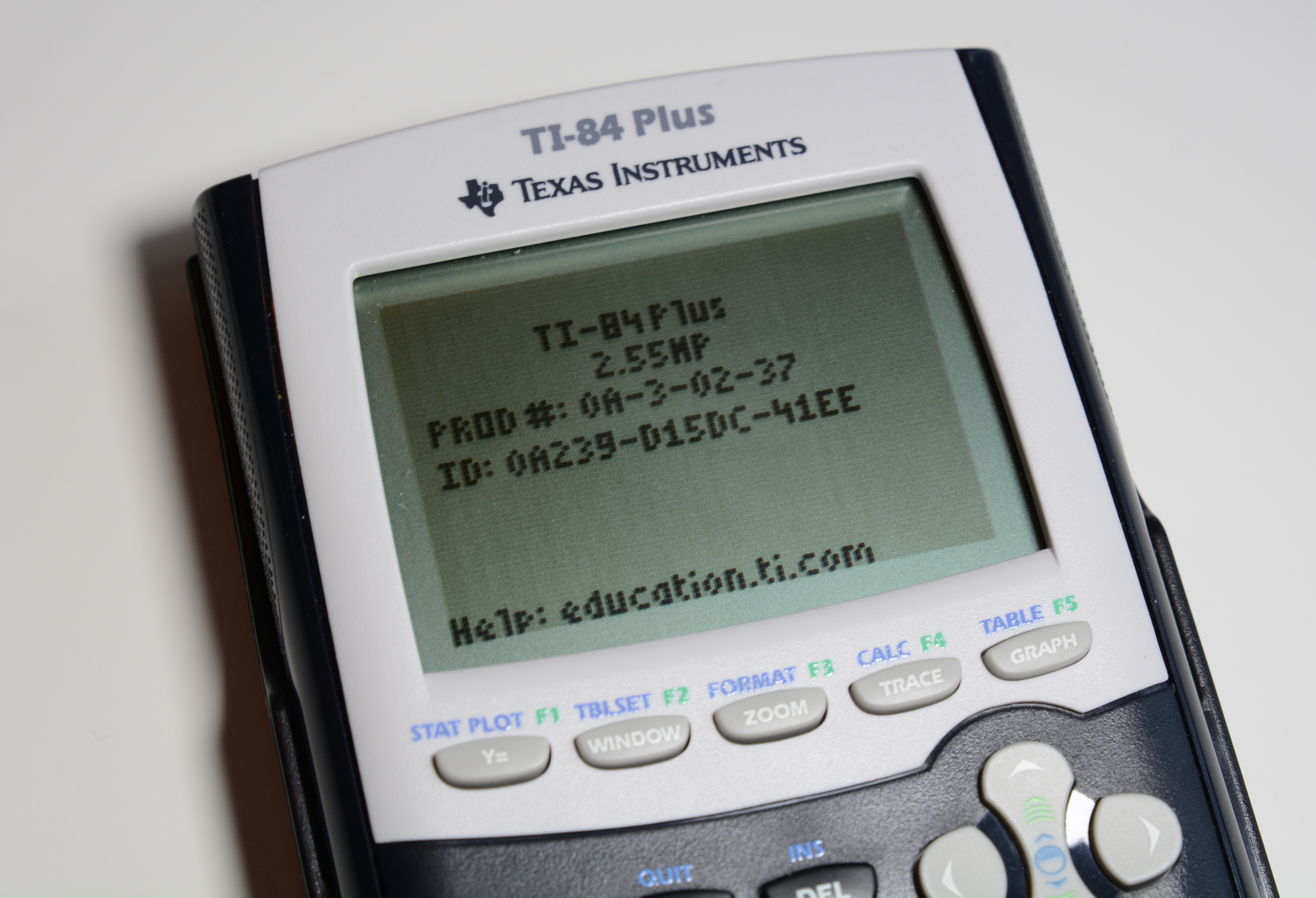
Display with specifications

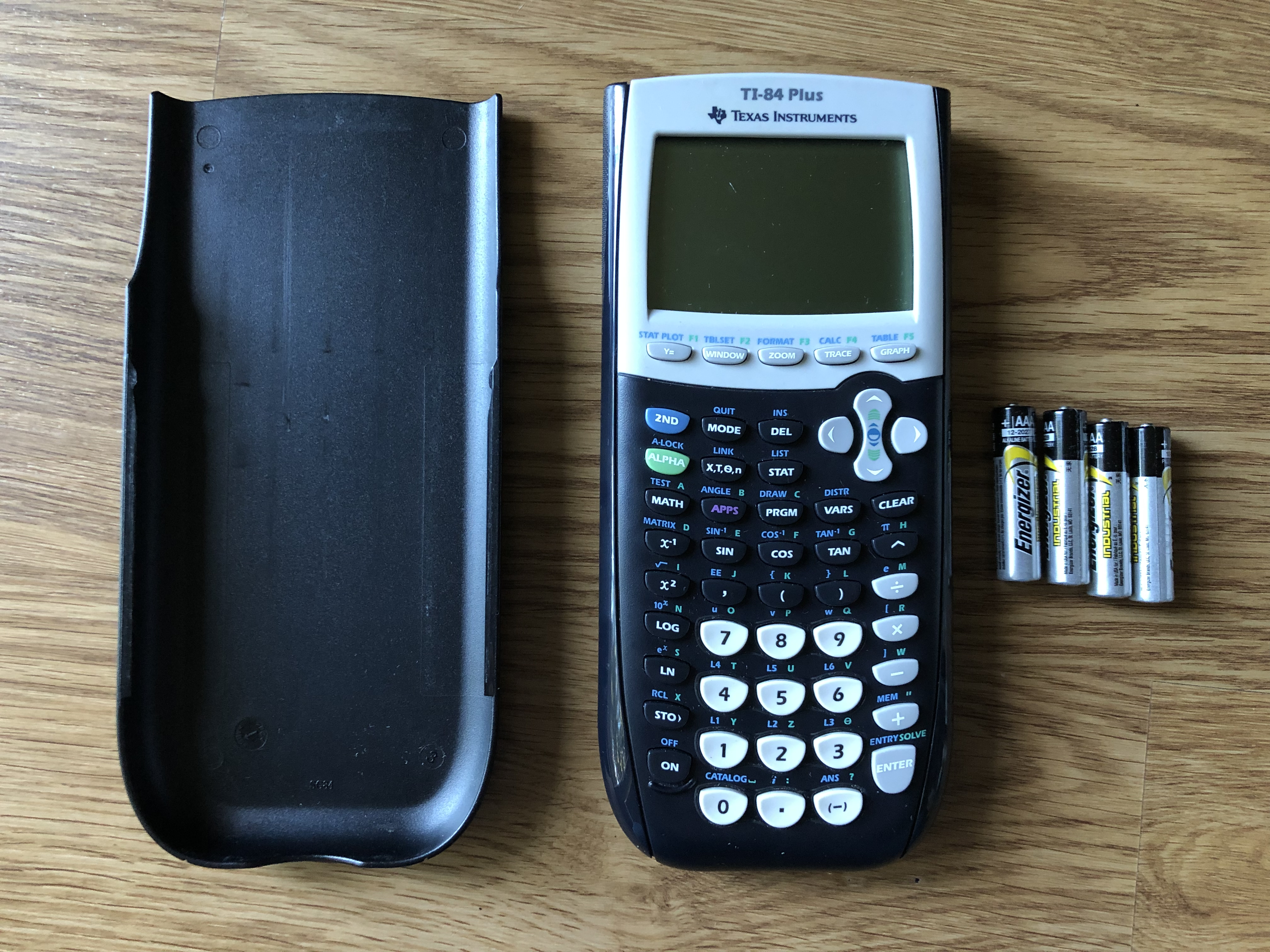
TI-84 Plus, batteries, and cover

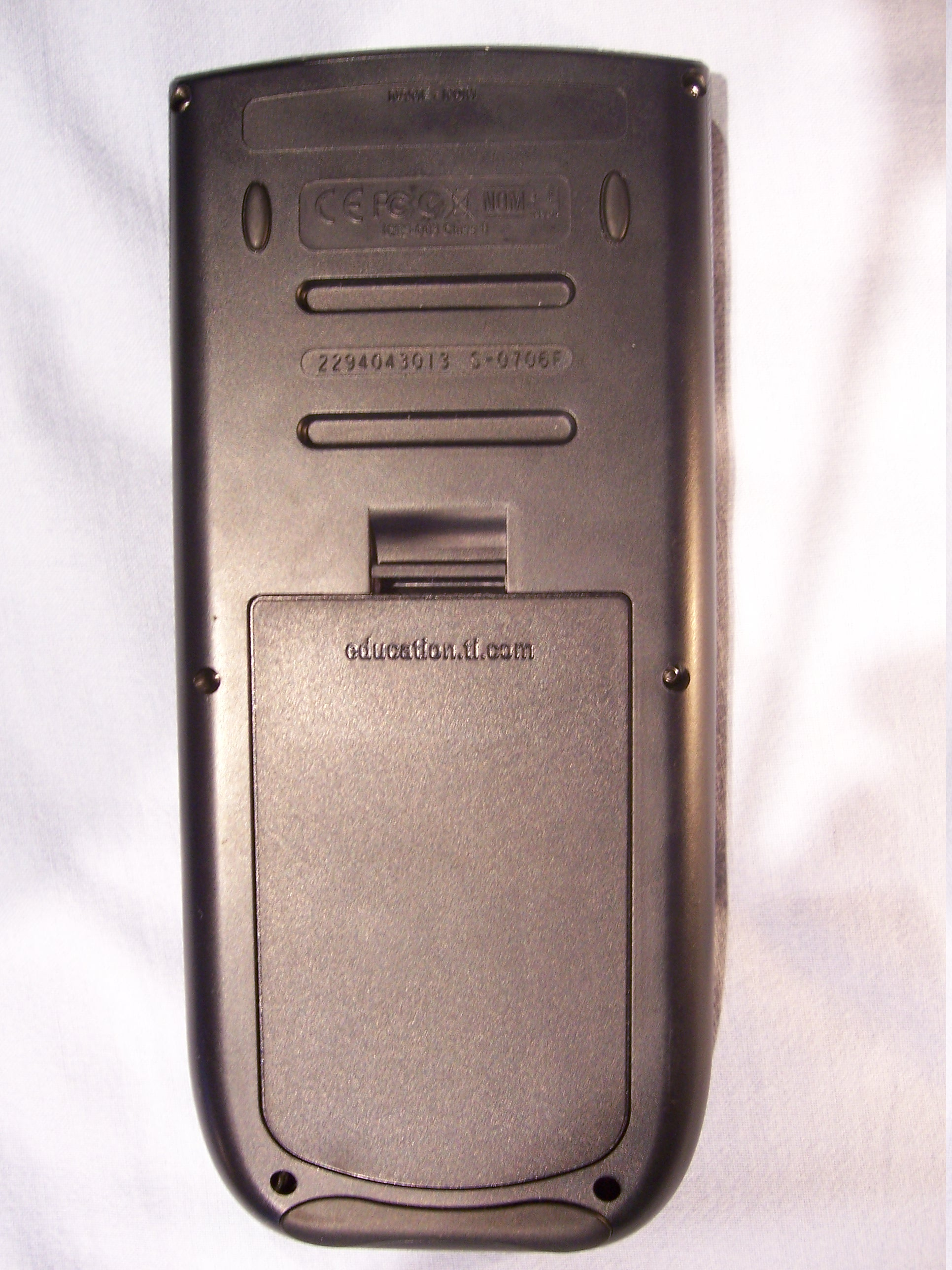
Back with battery cover

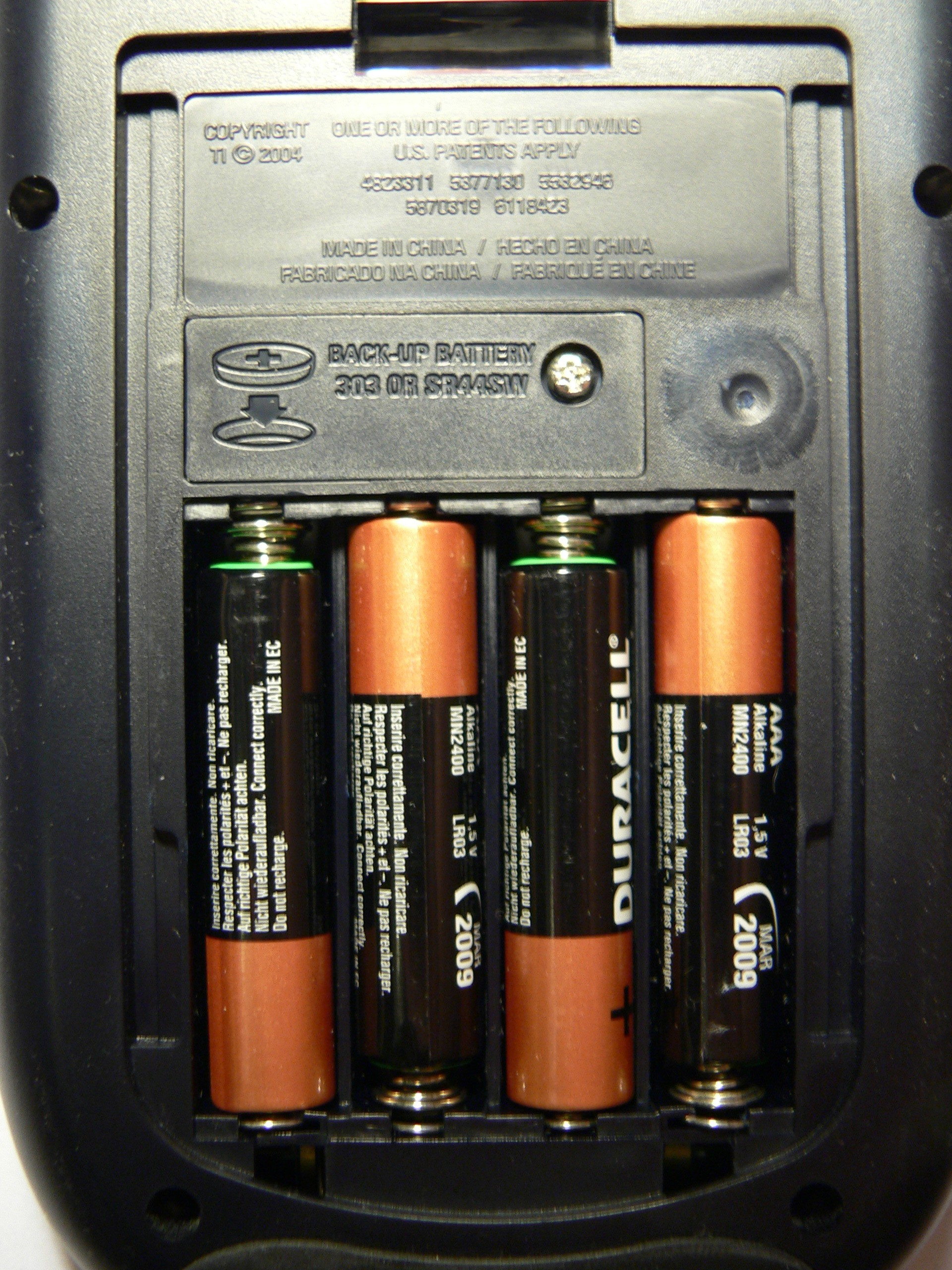
Battery compartment

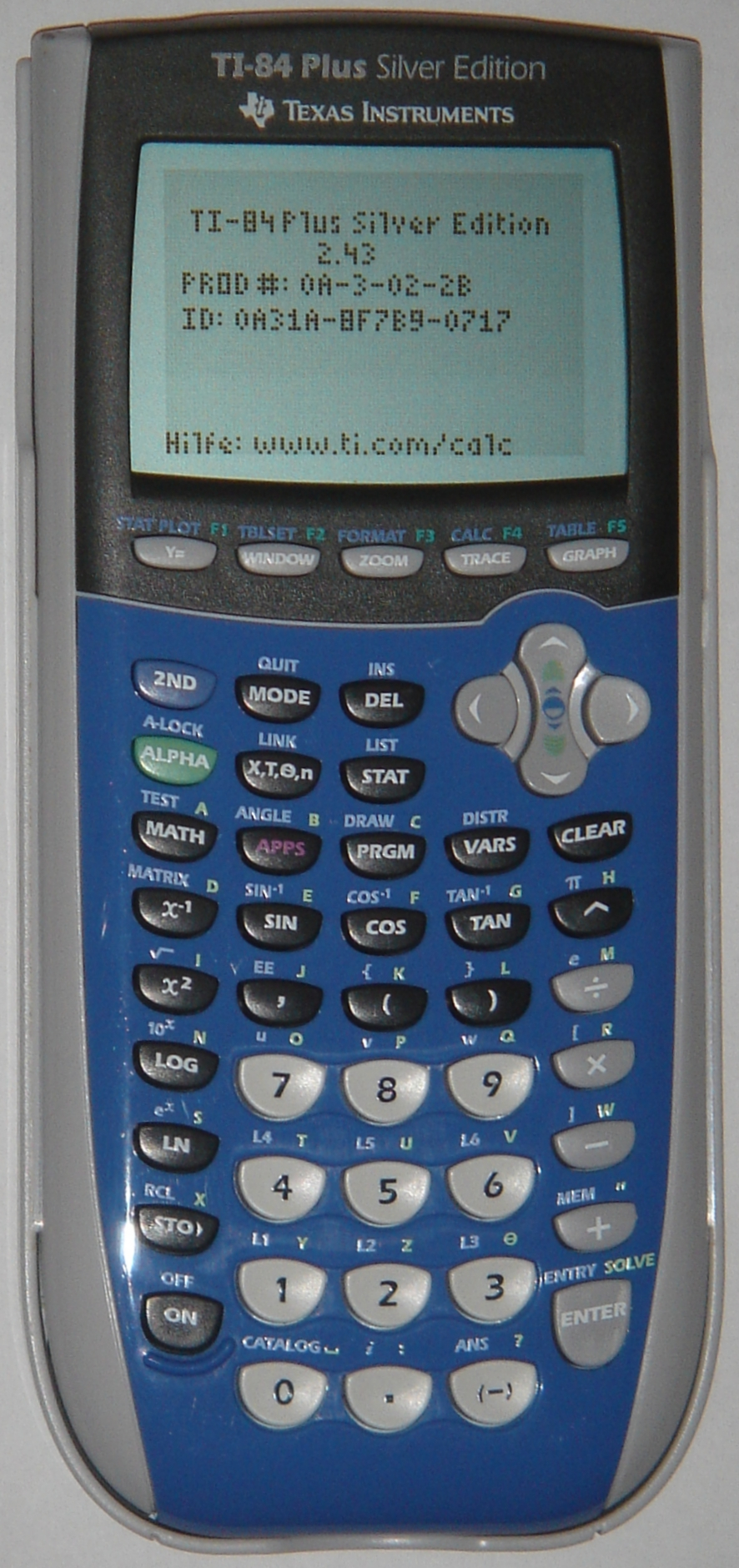
Custom blue faceplate applied

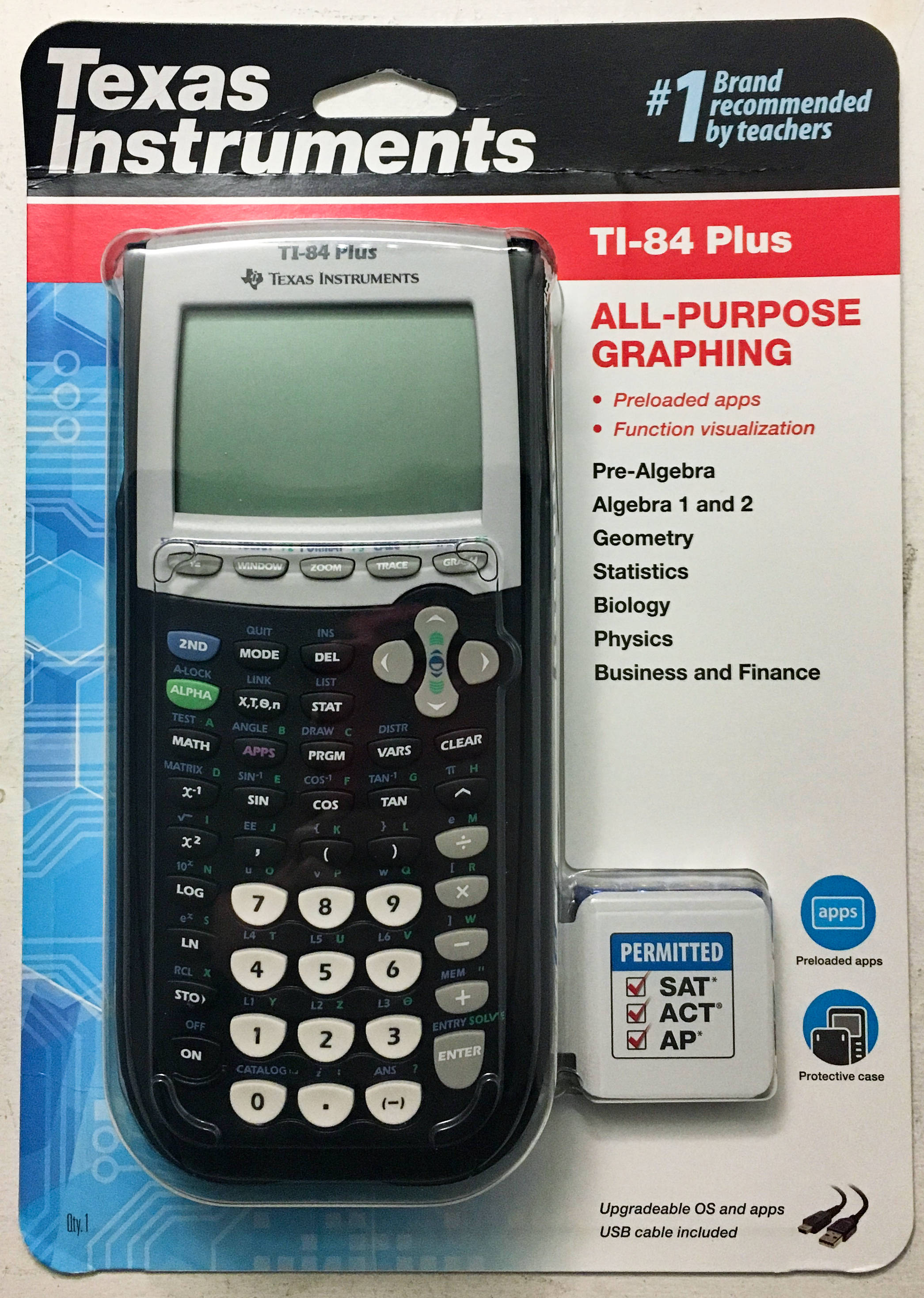
Retail package

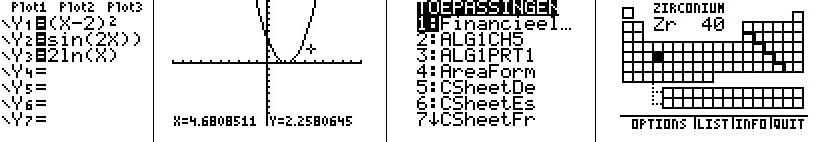
Screen captures, graph and application menu

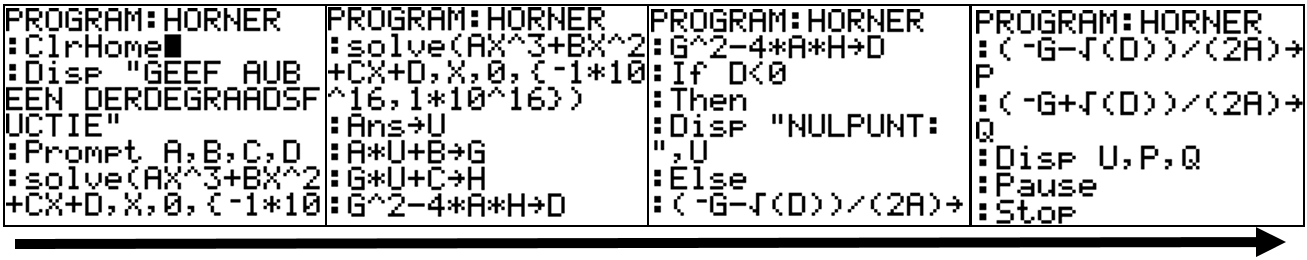
Screen captures of a TI-BASIC program in the built-in IDE

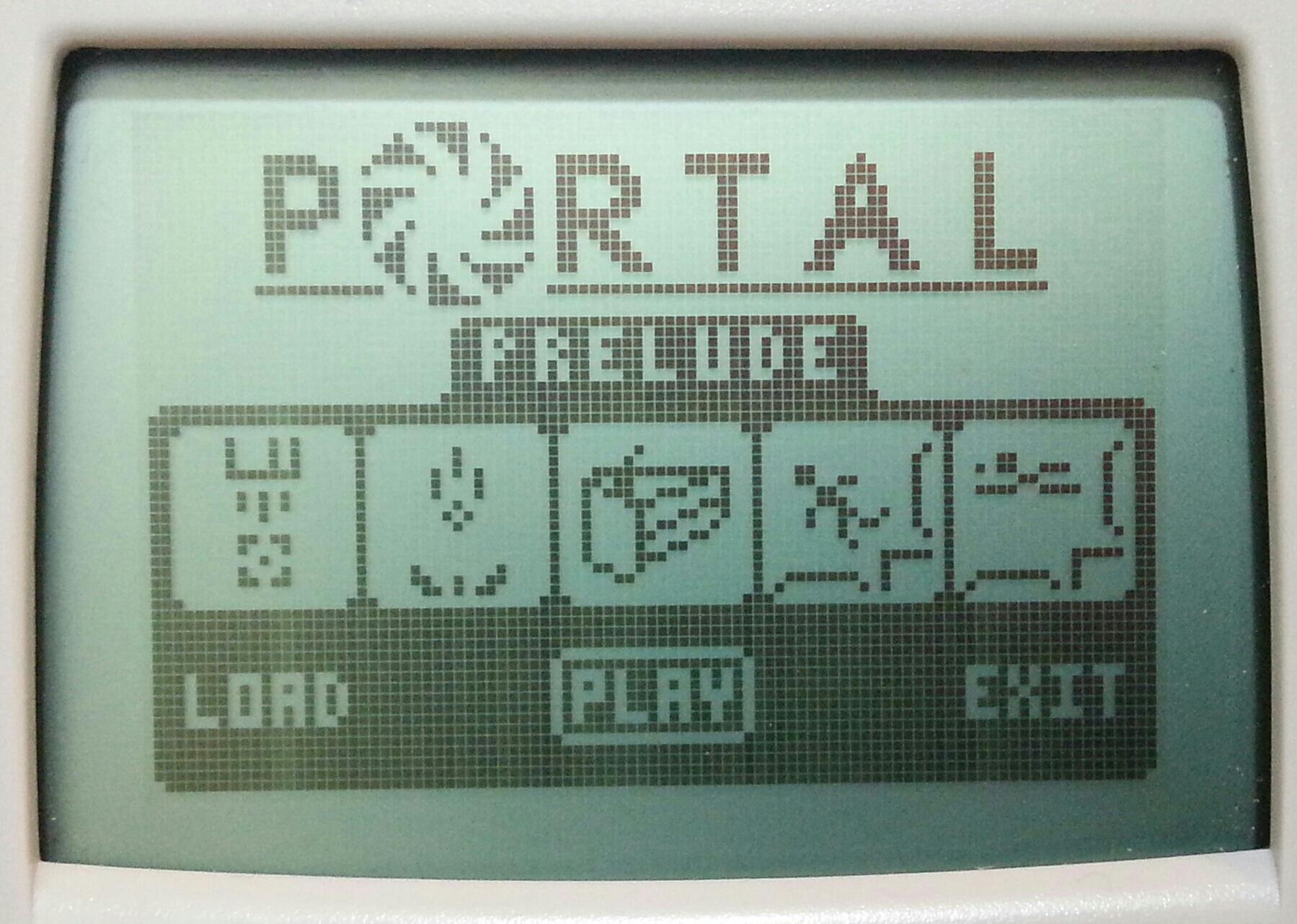
Community-made game, clone of Portal

== See also ==
- Comparison of Texas Instruments graphing calculators
- TI-BASIC
