= HP-17B =

Discontinued Hewlett-Packard financial calculator

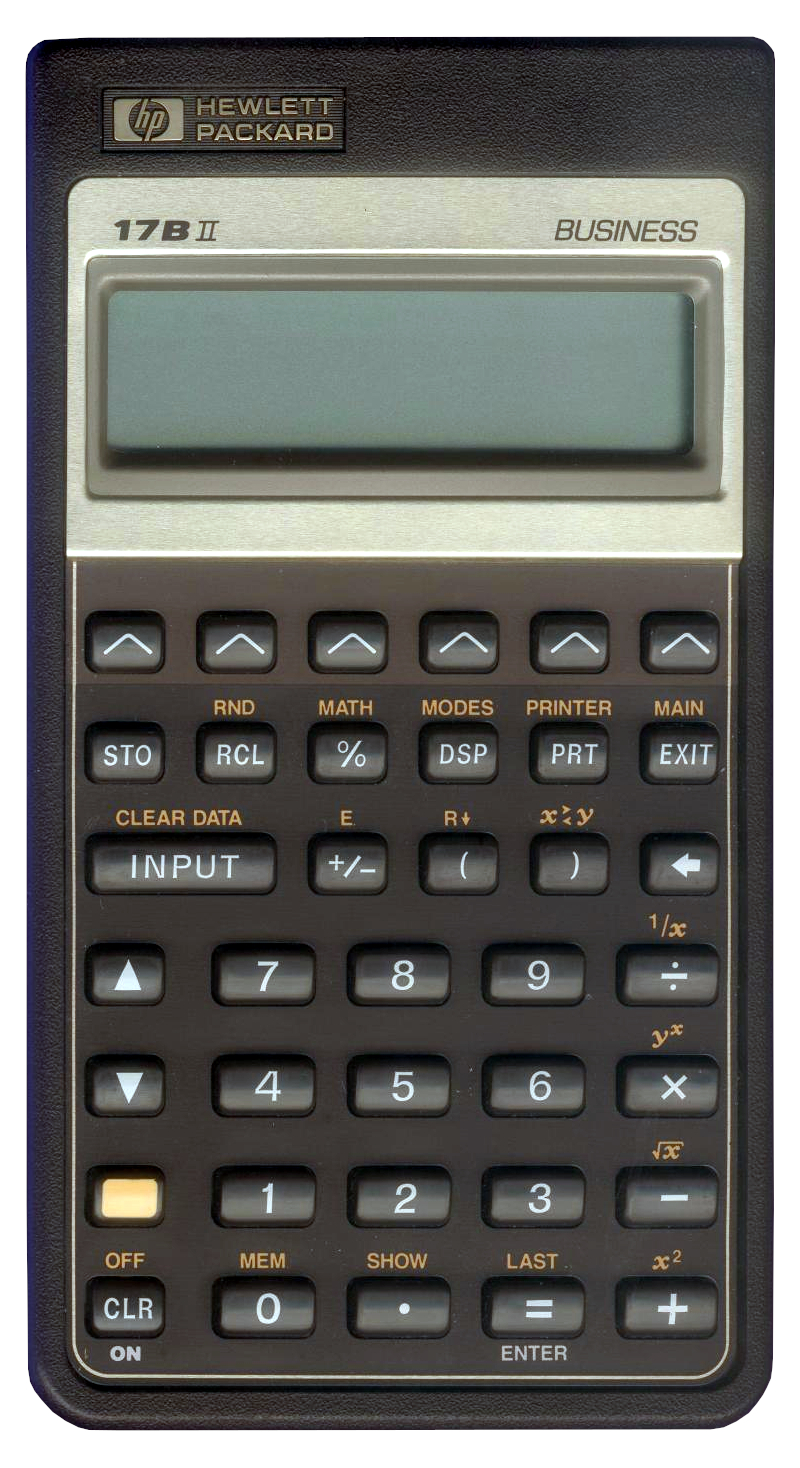
- HP-17B
- Type: Business
- Manufacturer: Hewlett-Packard
- Introduced: 1988
- Discontinued: 1990
- Cost: $110

Calculator
- Entry mode: Algebraic, RPN
- Display type: LCD
- Display size: 131×16

CPU
- Processor: Saturn (Lewis)
- Frequency: 1 MHz

Programming
- User memory: 8 KB
- Firmware memory: 64 KB of ROM

Other
- Power supply: 3 button sized cells
- Weight: 4.25 oz
- Dimensions: 14.7 cm length, 7.8 cm width, 1.5 cm height.

HP-17B is an algebraic entry financial and business calculator manufactured by Hewlett-Packard, introduced on 4 January 1988 along with the HP-19B, HP-27S and the HP-28S. It was a simplified business model, like the 19B. There were two versions, the US one working in English only, and the international one with a choice of six languages (English, German, Spanish, French, Italian, and Portuguese).

== HP-17B ==
HP-17B code name was Trader and it belonged to the Pioneer series of Hewlett-Packard calculators. It had a 131×16 LCD dot matrix, 22×2 characters, menu-driven display, used a Saturn processor and had a memory of 8000 bytes, of which 6750 bytes were available to the user for variable and equation storage. The HP-17B had a clock with alarm that allowed for basic agenda capabilities, as well an infrared port for printing to some Hewlett-Packard infrared printers.

== HP 17BII ==
The 17B was replaced by the HP 17BII (F1638A) (code name Trader II) in January 1990, which added RPN entry.

== HP 17bII+ ==
The 17BII was replaced by the HP 17bII+ in 2003. Two significantly different case variants of the 17bII+ exist. The newer 17bII+ (F2234A), introduced in 2007, with Sunplus Technology SPLB31A CPU was developed and is manufactured by Kinpo Electronics.
