= Significant figures =

Digit necessary to represent a quantity

Significant figures, also referred to as significant digits, are specific digits within a number that is written in positional notation that carry both reliability and necessity in conveying a particular quantity. When presenting the outcome of a measurement (such as length, pressure, volume, or mass), if the number of digits exceeds what the measurement instrument can resolve, only the digits that are determined by the resolution are dependable and therefore considered significant.

For instance, if a length measurement yields 114.8 millimetres (mm), using a ruler with the smallest interval between marks at 1 mm, the first three digits (1, 1, and 4, representing 114 mm) are certain and constitute significant figures. Further, digits that are uncertain yet meaningful are also included in the significant figures. In this example, the last digit (8, contributing 0.8 mm) is likewise considered significant despite its uncertainty. Therefore, this measurement contains four significant figures.

Another example involves a volume measurement of 2.98 litres (L) with an uncertainty of ± 0.05 L. The actual volume falls between 2.93 L and 3.03 L. Even if certain digits are not completely known, they are still significant if they are meaningful, as they indicate the actual volume within an acceptable range of uncertainty. In this case, the actual volume might be 2.94 L or possibly 3.02 L, so all three digits are considered significant. Thus, there are three significant figures in this example.

The following types of digits are not considered significant:

- Leading zeros. For instance, 013 kg has two significant figures—1 and 3—while the leading zero is insignificant since it does not impact the mass indication; 013 kg is equivalent to 13 kg, rendering the zero unnecessary. Similarly, in the case of 0.056 m, there are two insignificant leading zeros since 0.056 m is the same as 56 mm, thus the leading zeros do not contribute to the length indication.
- Trailing zeros when they serve as placeholders. In the measurement 1500 m, when the measurement resolution is 100 m, the trailing zeros are insignificant as they simply stand for the tens and ones places. In this instance, 1500 m indicates the length is approximately 1500 m rather than an exact value of 1500 m.
- Spurious digits that arise from calculations resulting in a higher precision than the original data or a measurement reported with greater precision than the instrument's resolution.

A zero after a decimal point (e.g., 1.0) is significant, and care should be used when appending such a decimal of zero. Thus, in the case of 1.0, there are two significant figures, whereas 1 (without a decimal) has one significant figure.

Among a number's significant digits, the most significant digit is the one with the greatest exponent value (the leftmost significant digit/figure), while the least significant digit is the one with the lowest exponent value (the rightmost significant digit/figure). For example, in the number "123" the "1" is the most significant digit, representing hundreds (10^{2}), while the "3" is the least significant digit, representing ones (10^{0}).

To avoid conveying a misleading level of precision, numbers are often rounded. For instance, it would create false precision to present a measurement as 12345.25 g when the measuring instrument only provides accuracy to the nearest gram. In this case, the significant figures are the first five digits (1, 2, 3, 4, and 5) from the leftmost digit, and the number should be rounded to these significant figures, resulting in 12345 g as the reliable value. The rounding error (in this example, 0.25 g) approximates the numerical resolution or precision. Numbers can also be rounded for simplicity, not necessarily to indicate measurement precision, such as for the sake of expediency in news broadcasts.

Significance arithmetic encompasses a set of approximate rules for preserving significance through calculations. More advanced scientific rules are known as the propagation of uncertainty.

Radix 10 (base-10, decimal numbers) is assumed in the following. (See Unit in the last place for extending these concepts to other bases.)

== Identifying significant figures ==
=== Rules to identify significant figures in a number ===
Digits in light blue are significant figures; those in black are not.

Identifying the significant figures in a number requires knowing which digits are meaningful, which requires knowing the resolution with which the number is measured, obtained, or processed. For example, if the measurable smallest mass is 0.001 g, then in a measurement given as 0.00234 g the "4" is not useful and should be discarded, while the "3" is useful and should often be retained.

- Non-zero digits within the given measurement or reporting resolution are significant.
  - 91 has two significant figures (9 and 1) if they are measurement-allowed digits.
  - 123.45 has five significant digits (1, 2, 3, 4 and 5) if they are within the measurement resolution. If the resolution is, say, 0.1, then the 5 shows that the true value to 4 significant figures is equally likely to be 123.4 or 123.5.
- Zeros between two significant non-zero digits are significant (significant trapped zeros).
  - 101.12003 consists of eight significant figures if the resolution is to 0.00001.
  - 125.340006 has seven significant figures if the resolution is to 0.0001: 1, 2, 5, 3, 4, 0, and 0.
- Zeros to the left of the first non-zero digit (leading zeros) are not significant.
  - If a length measurement gives 0.052 km, then 0.052 km = 52 m so 5 and 2 are only significant; the leading zeros appear or disappear, depending on which unit is used, so they are not necessary to indicate the measurement scale.
  - 0.00034 has 2 significant figures (3 and 4) if the resolution is 0.00001.
- Zeros to the right of the last non-zero digit (trailing zeros) in a number with the decimal point are significant if they are within the measurement or reporting resolution.
  - 1.200 has four significant figures (1, 2, 0, and 0) if they are allowed by the measurement resolution.
  - 0.0980 has three significant digits (9, 8, and the last zero) if they are within the measurement resolution.
  - 120.000 consists of six significant figures (1, 2, and the four subsequent zeroes) if, as before, they are within the measurement resolution.
- Trailing zeros in an integer may or may not be significant, depending on the measurement or reporting resolution.
  - 45600 has 3, 4 or 5 significant figures depending on how the last zeros are used. For example, if the length of a road is reported as 45600 m without information about the reporting or measurement resolution, then it is not clear if the road length is precisely measured as 45600 m or if it is a rough estimate. If it is the rough estimation, then only the first three non-zero digits are significant since the trailing zeros are neither reliable nor necessary; 45600 m can be expressed as 45.6 km or as 4.56×10^{4} m in scientific notation, and neither expression requires the trailing zeros.
- An exact number has an infinite number of significant figures.
  - If the number of apples in a bag is 4 (exact number), then this number is 4.0000... (with infinite trailing zeros to the right of the decimal point). As a result, 4 does not impact the number of significant figures or digits in the result of calculations with it.
- A mathematical or physical constant has significant figures to its known digits.
  - π is a specific real number with several equivalent definitions. All of the digits in its exact decimal expansion 3.14159... are significant. Although many properties of these digits are known – for example, they do not repeat, because π is irrational – not all of the digits are known. As of March 2024, more than 102 trillion digits have been calculated. A 102 trillion-digit approximation has 102 trillion significant digits. In practical applications, far fewer digits are used. The everyday approximation 3.14 has three significant figures and 7 correct binary digits. The approximation 22/7 has the same three correct decimal digits but has 10 correct binary digits. Most calculators and computer programs can handle a 16-digit approximation sufficient for interplanetary navigation calculations.
  - The Planck constant is defined as exactly h = 6.62607015×10^{−34} J⋅s.

=== Ways to denote significant figures in an integer with trailing zeros ===
The significance of trailing zeros in a number not containing a decimal point can be ambiguous. For example, it may not always be clear if the number 1300 is precise to the nearest unit (just happens coincidentally to be an exact multiple of a hundred) or if it is only shown to the nearest hundreds due to rounding or uncertainty. Many conventions exist to address this issue. However, these are not universally used and would only be effective if the reader is familiar with the convention:

- An overline, sometimes also called an overbar, or less accurately, a vinculum, may be placed over the last significant figure; any trailing zeros following this are insignificant. For example, 130̅0 has three significant figures (and hence indicates that the number is precise to the nearest ten).
- Less often, using a closely related convention, the last significant figure of a number may be underlined; for example, "1300" has two significant figures.
- A decimal point may be placed after the number; for example "1300." indicates specifically that trailing zeros are meant to be significant.

As the conventions above are not in general use, the following more widely recognized options are available for indicating the significance of number with trailing zeros:

- Eliminate ambiguous or non-significant zeros by changing the unit prefix in a number with a unit of measurement. For example, the precision of measurement specified as 1300 g is ambiguous, while if stated as 1.30 kg it is not. Likewise 0.0123 L can be rewritten as 12.3 mL.
- Eliminate ambiguous or non-significant zeros by using Scientific Notation: For example, 1300 with three significant figures becomes 1.30×10^{3}. Likewise 0.0123 can be rewritten as 1.23×10^{−2}. The part of the representation that contains the significant figures (1.30 or 1.23) is known as the significand or mantissa. The digits in the base and exponent (10^{3} or 10^{−2}) are considered exact numbers so for these digits, significant figures are irrelevant.
- Explicitly state the number of significant figures (the abbreviation s.f. is sometimes used): For example "20 000 to 2 s.f." or "20 000 (2 sf)".
- State the expected variability (precision) explicitly with a plus–minus sign, as in "20 000 ± 1%". This also allows specifying a range of precision in-between powers of ten.

== Rounding to significant figures ==
Rounding to significant figures is a more general-purpose technique than rounding to n digits, since it handles numbers of different scales in a uniform way. For example, the population of a city might only be known to the nearest thousand and be stated as 52,000, while the population of a country might only be known to the nearest million and be stated as 52,000,000. The former might be in error by hundreds, and the latter might be in error by hundreds of thousands, but both have two significant figures (5 and 2). This reflects the fact that the significance of the error is the same in both cases, relative to the size of the quantity being measured.

To round a number to n significant figures:

1. If the n + 1 digit is greater than 5 or is 5 followed by other non-zero digits, add 1 to the n digit. For example, if we want to round 1.2459 to 3 significant figures, then this step results in 1.25.
2. If the n + 1 digit is 5 not followed by other digits or followed by only zeros, then rounding requires a tie-breaking rule. For example, to round 1.25 to 2 significant figures:
  - Round half away from zero rounds up to 1.3. This is the default rounding method implied in many disciplines if the required rounding method is not specified.
  - Round half to even, which rounds to the nearest even number. With this method, 1.25 is rounded down to 1.2. If this method applies to 1.35, then it is rounded up to 1.4. This is the method preferred by many scientific disciplines, because, for example, it avoids skewing the average value of a long list of values upwards.
3. For an integer in rounding, replace the digits after the n digit with zeros. For example, if 1254 is rounded to 2 significant figures, then 5 and 4 are replaced to 0 so that it will be 1300. For a number with the decimal point in rounding, remove the digits after the n digit. For example, if 14.895 is rounded to 3 significant figures, then the digits after 8 are removed so that it will be 14.9.

In financial calculations a number is often rounded from a given number of places. In grocery stores the cost per unit pricing to three decimal places (which is not the retail price) is placed on the shelving; it is also used in procurement in that industry, and in property tax assessments. The "9/10th" vulgar fraction in gas station signage is identical to three decimal places, which is what is used at the pump. In banking and high finance back offices (the fine print as a matter of contract drafting), the de facto standard is seven decimal places to the right of the decimal point. In Oregon a minimum of seven digits is mandated in taxation statute for the calculation for late interest payments. Finally, crypto be subdivided into any arbitrary number of decimal places, not all of practical end use. This digital dust can present a threat surface for a dusting attack.

As an illustration, the decimal quantity 12.345 can be expressed with various numbers of significant figures or decimal places. If insufficient precision is available then the number is rounded in some manner to fit the available precision. The following table shows the results for various total precision at two rounding ways.

Precision	Rounded to significant figures	Rounded to decimal places
6	12.3450	12.345000
5	12.345	12.34500
4	12.34 or 12.35	12.3450
3	12.3	12.345
2	12	12.34 or 12.35
1	10	12.3
0	—N/a	12

Another example for 0.012345. (Remember that the leading zeros are not significant.)

Precision	Rounded to significant figures	Rounded to decimal places
7	0.01234500	0.0123450
6	0.0123450	0.012345
5	0.012345	0.01234 or 0.01235
4	0.01234 or 0.01235	0.0123
3	0.0123	0.012
2	0.012	0.01
1	0.01	0.0
0	—N/a	0

The representation of a non-zero number x to a precision of p significant digits has a numerical value that is given by the formula:

$$10^n \cdot \operatorname{round}\left(\frac{x}{10^n}\right)$$

where

$$n=\lfloor \log_{10} (|x|) \rfloor + 1 - p$$

which may need to be written with a specific marking as detailed above to specify the number of significant trailing zeros.

== Writing uncertainty and implied uncertainty ==
=== Significant figures in writing uncertainty ===
It is recommended for a measurement result to include the measurement uncertainty such as $x_\text{best}\pm\sigma_{x}$, where x_{best} and σ_{x} are the best estimate and uncertainty in the measurement respectively. x_{best} can be the average of measured values and σ_{x} can be the standard deviation or a multiple of the measurement deviation. The rules to write $x_\text{best}\pm\sigma_{x}$ are:

- σ_{x} should usually be quoted to only one or two significant figures, as more precision is unlikely to be reliable or meaningful:
  - 1.79 ± 0.06 (correct), 1.79 ± 0.96 (correct), 1.79 ± 1.96 (incorrect).
- The digit positions of the last significant figures in x_{best} and σ_{x} are the same, otherwise the consistency is lost. For example, "1.79 ± 0.067" is incorrect, as it does not make sense to have more accurate uncertainty than the best estimate.
  - 1.79 ± 0.06 (correct), 1.79 ± 0.96 (correct), 1.79 ± 0.067 (incorrect).

=== Implied uncertainty ===
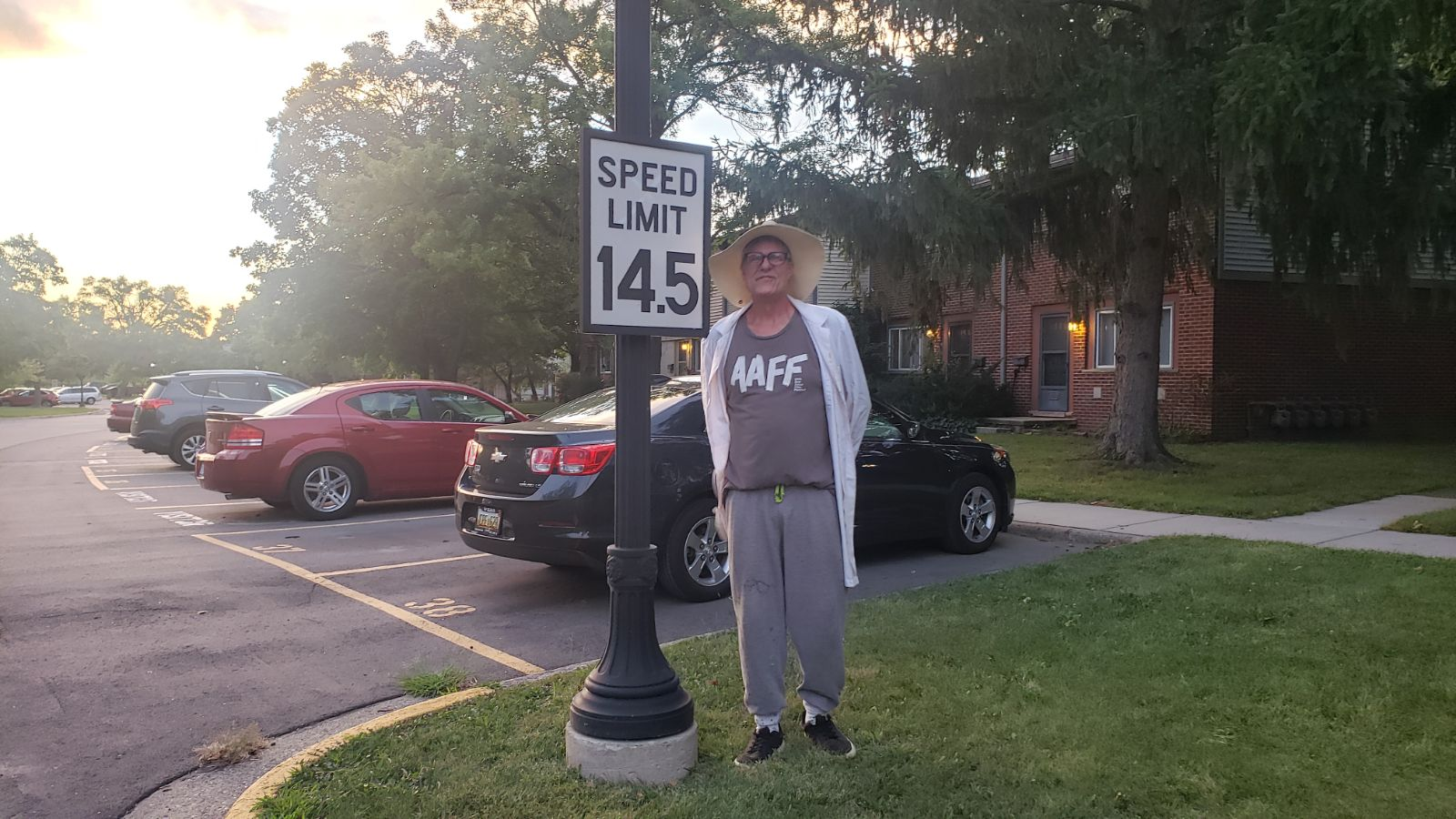
Persnickety sign implies 14.6 is speed violation.

Uncertainty may be implied by the last significant figure if it is not explicitly expressed. The implied uncertainty is ± the half of the minimum scale at the last significant figure position. For example, if the mass of an object is reported as 3.78 kg without mentioning uncertainty, then ± 0.005 kg measurement uncertainty may be implied. If the mass of an object is estimated as 3.78 ± 0.07 kg, so the actual mass is probably somewhere in the range 3.71 to 3.85 kg, and it is desired to report it with a single number, then 3.8 kg is the best number to report since its implied uncertainty ± 0.05 kg gives a mass range of 3.75 to 3.85 kg, which is close to the measurement range. If the uncertainty is a bit larger, i.e. 3.78 ± 0.09 kg, then 3.8 kg is still the best single number to quote, since if "4 kg" was reported then a lot of information would be lost.

If there is a need to write the implied uncertainty of a number, then it can be written as $x\pm\sigma_{x}$with stating it as the implied uncertainty (to prevent readers from recognizing it as the measurement uncertainty), where x and σ_{x} are the number with an extra zero digit (to follow the rules to write uncertainty above) and the implied uncertainty of it respectively. For example, 6 kg with the implied uncertainty ± 0.5 kg can be stated as 6.0 ± 0.5 kg.

== Arithmetic ==
As there are rules to determine the significant figures in directly measured quantities, there are also guidelines (not rules) to determine the significant figures in quantities calculated from these measured quantities.

Significant figures in measured quantities are most important in the determination of significant figures in calculated quantities with them. A mathematical or physical constant (e.g., π in the formula for the area of a circle with radius r as πr^{2}) has no effect on the determination of the significant figures in the result of a calculation with it if its known digits are equal to or more than the significant figures in the measured quantities used in the calculation. An exact number such as 1/2 in the formula for the kinetic energy of a mass m with velocity v as 1/2mv^{2} has no bearing on the significant figures in the calculated kinetic energy since its number of significant figures is infinite (0.500000...).

The guidelines described below are intended to avoid a calculation result more precise than the measured quantities, but it does not ensure the resulted implied uncertainty close enough to the measured uncertainties. This problem can be seen in unit conversion. If the guidelines give the implied uncertainty too far from the measured ones, then it may be needed to decide significant digits that give comparable uncertainty.

=== Multiplication and division ===
For quantities created from measured quantities via multiplication and division, the calculated result should have as many significant figures as the least number of significant figures among the measured quantities used in the calculation. For example,

- 1.234 × 2 = 2̅.468 ≈ 2
- 1.234 × 2.0 = 2.4̅68 ≈ 2.5
- 0.01234 × 2 = 0.02̅468 ≈ 0.02
- 0.012345678 / 0.00234 = 5.27̅59 ≈ 5.28

with one, two, one and three significant figures respectively. (2 here is assumed not an exact number.) For the first example, the first multiplication factor has four significant figures and the second has one significant figure. The factor with the fewest or least significant figures is the second one with only one, so the final calculated result should also have one significant figure.

==== Exception ====
For unit conversion, the implied uncertainty of the result can be unsatisfactorily higher than that in the previous unit if this rounding guideline is followed; For example, 8 inches has the implied uncertainty of ± 0.5 inch = ± 1.27 cm. If it is converted to the centimeter scale and the rounding guideline for multiplication and division is followed, then 2̅0.32 cm ≈ 20 cm with the implied uncertainty of ± 5 cm. If this implied uncertainty is considered as too overestimated, then more proper significant digits in the unit conversion result may be 20̅.32 cm ≈ 20. cm with the implied uncertainty of ± 0.5 cm.

Another exception of applying the above rounding guideline is to multiply a number by an integer, such as 1.234 × 9. If the above guideline is followed, then the result is rounded as 1.234 × 9.000.... = 11.10̅6 ≈ 11.11. However, this multiplication is essentially adding 1.234 to itself 9 times such as 1.234 + 1.234 + … + 1.234 so the rounding guideline for addition and subtraction described below is more proper rounding approach. As a result, the final answer is 1.234 + 1.234 + … + 1.234 = 11.106̅ = 11.106 (one significant digit increase).

=== Addition and subtraction of significant figures ===
For quantities created from measured quantities via addition and subtraction, the last significant figure position (e.g., hundreds, tens, ones, tenths, hundredths, and so forth) in the calculated result should be the same as the leftmost or largest digit position among the last significant figures of the measured quantities in the calculation. For example,

- 1.234 + 2 = 3̅.234 ≈ 3
- 1.234 + 2.0 = 3.2̅34 ≈ 3.2
- 0.01234 + 2 = 2̅.01234 ≈ 2
- 12000 + 77 = 12̅077 ≈ 12000

with the last significant figures in the ones place, tenths place, ones place, and thousands place respectively. (2 here is assumed not an exact number.) For the first example, the first term has its last significant figure in the thousandths place and the second term has its last significant figure in the ones place. The leftmost or largest digit position among the last significant figures of these terms is the ones place, so the calculated result should also have its last significant figure in the ones place.

The rule to calculate significant figures for multiplication and division are not the same as the rule for addition and subtraction. For multiplication and division, only the total number of significant figures in each of the factors in the calculation matters; the digit position of the last significant figure in each factor is irrelevant. For addition and subtraction, only the digit position of the last significant figure in each of the terms in the calculation matters; the total number of significant figures in each term is irrelevant. However, greater accuracy will often be obtained if some non-significant digits are maintained in intermediate results which are used in subsequent calculations.

=== Logarithm and antilogarithm ===
The base-10 logarithm of a normalized number (i.e., a × 10^{b} with 1 ≤ a < 10 and b as an integer), is rounded such that its decimal part (called mantissa) has as many significant figures as the significant figures in the normalized number.

- log_{10}(3.000 × 10^{4}) = log_{10}(10^{4}) + log_{10}(3.000) = 4.000000... (exact number so infinite significant digits) + 0.4771̅212547... = 4.4771̅212547 ≈ 4.4771.

When taking the antilogarithm of a normalized number, the result is rounded to have as many significant figures as the significant figures in the decimal part of the number to be antiloged.

- 10^{4.4771} = 2999̅8.5318119... = 30000 = 3.000 × 10^{4}.

=== Transcendental functions ===
If a transcendental function $f(x)$ (e.g., the exponential function, the logarithm, and the trigonometric functions) is differentiable at its domain element 'x', then its number of significant figures (denoted as $s(f(x))$) is approximately related with the number of significant figures in x (denoted as $s(x)$) by the formula

${s(f(x))} \approx {s(x)} - \log_{10} \left ( \left\vert{\frac{df(x)}{dx} \frac{x}{f(x)}}\right\vert \right )$,

where $\left\vert{\frac{df(x)}{dx} \frac{x}{f(x)}}\right\vert$ is the condition number.

=== Round only on the final calculation result ===
When performing multiple stage calculations, do not round intermediate stage calculation results; keep as many digits as is practical (at least one more digit than the rounding rule allows per stage) until the end of all the calculations to avoid cumulative rounding errors while tracking or recording the significant figures in each intermediate result. Then, round the final result, for example, to the fewest number of significant figures (for multiplication or division) or leftmost last significant digit position (for addition or subtraction) among the inputs in the final calculation.

- (2.3494 + 1.345) × 1.2 = 3.694̅4 × 1.2 = 4.4̅3328 ≈ 4.4.
- (2.3494 × 1.345) + 1.2 = 3.159̅943 + 1.2 = 4.3̅59943 ≈ 4.4.

== Estimating an extra digit ==
When using a ruler, initially use the smallest mark as the first estimated digit. For example, if a ruler's smallest mark is 0.1 cm, and 4.5 cm is read, then it is 4.5 (±0.1 cm) or 4.4 cm to 4.6 cm as to the smallest mark interval. However, in practice a measurement can usually be estimated by eye to closer than the interval between the ruler's smallest mark, e.g. in the above case it might be estimated as between 4.51 cm and 4.53 cm.

It is also possible that the overall length of a ruler may not be accurate to the degree of the smallest mark, and the marks may be imperfectly spaced within each unit. However assuming a normal good quality ruler, it should be possible to estimate tenths between the nearest two marks to achieve an extra decimal place of accuracy. Failing to do this adds the error in reading the ruler to any error in the calibration of the ruler.

== Estimation in statistic ==
When estimating the proportion of individuals carrying some particular characteristic in a population, from a random sample of that population, the number of significant figures should not exceed the maximum precision allowed by that sample size.

== Relationship to accuracy and precision in measurement ==
Traditionally, in various technical fields, "accuracy" refers to the closeness of a given measurement to its true value; "precision" refers to the stability of that measurement when repeated many times. Thus, it is possible to be "precisely wrong". Hoping to reflect the way in which the term "accuracy" is actually used in the scientific community, there is a recent standard, ISO 5725, which keeps the same definition of precision but defines the term "trueness" as the closeness of a given measurement to its true value and uses the term "accuracy" as the combination of trueness and precision. (See the accuracy and precision article for a full discussion.) In either case, the number of significant figures roughly corresponds to precision, not to accuracy or the newer concept of trueness.

== In computing ==
Computer representations of floating-point numbers use a form of rounding to significant figures (while usually not keeping track of how many), in general with binary numbers. The number of correct significant figures is closely related to the notion of relative error (which has the advantage of being a more accurate measure of precision, and is independent of the radix, also known as the base, of the number system used).

Electronic calculators supporting a dedicated significant figures display mode are relatively rare.

Among the calculators to support related features are the Commodore M55 Mathematician (1976) and the S61 Statistician (1976), which support two display modes, where DISP+n will give n significant digits in total, while DISP+.+n will give n decimal places.

The Texas Instruments TI-83 Plus (1999) and TI-84 Plus (2004) families of graphical calculators support a Sig-Fig Calculator mode in which the calculator will evaluate the count of significant digits of entered numbers and display it in square brackets behind the corresponding number. The results of calculations will be adjusted to only show the significant digits as well.

For the HP 20b/30b-based community-developed WP 34S (2011) and WP 31S (2014) calculators significant figures display modes SIG+n and SIG0+n (with zero padding) are available as a compile-time option. The SwissMicros DM42-based community-developed calculators WP 43C (2019) / C43 (2022) / C47 (2023) support a significant figures display mode as well.

== See also ==
- Benford's law (first-digit law)
- Engineering notation
- Error bar
- False precision
- Guard digit
- Guesstimate
- IEEE 754 (IEEE floating-point standard)
- Interval arithmetic
- Kahan summation algorithm
- Precision (computer science)
- Round-off error
