= HP 30b =

Hewlett-Packard financial calculator

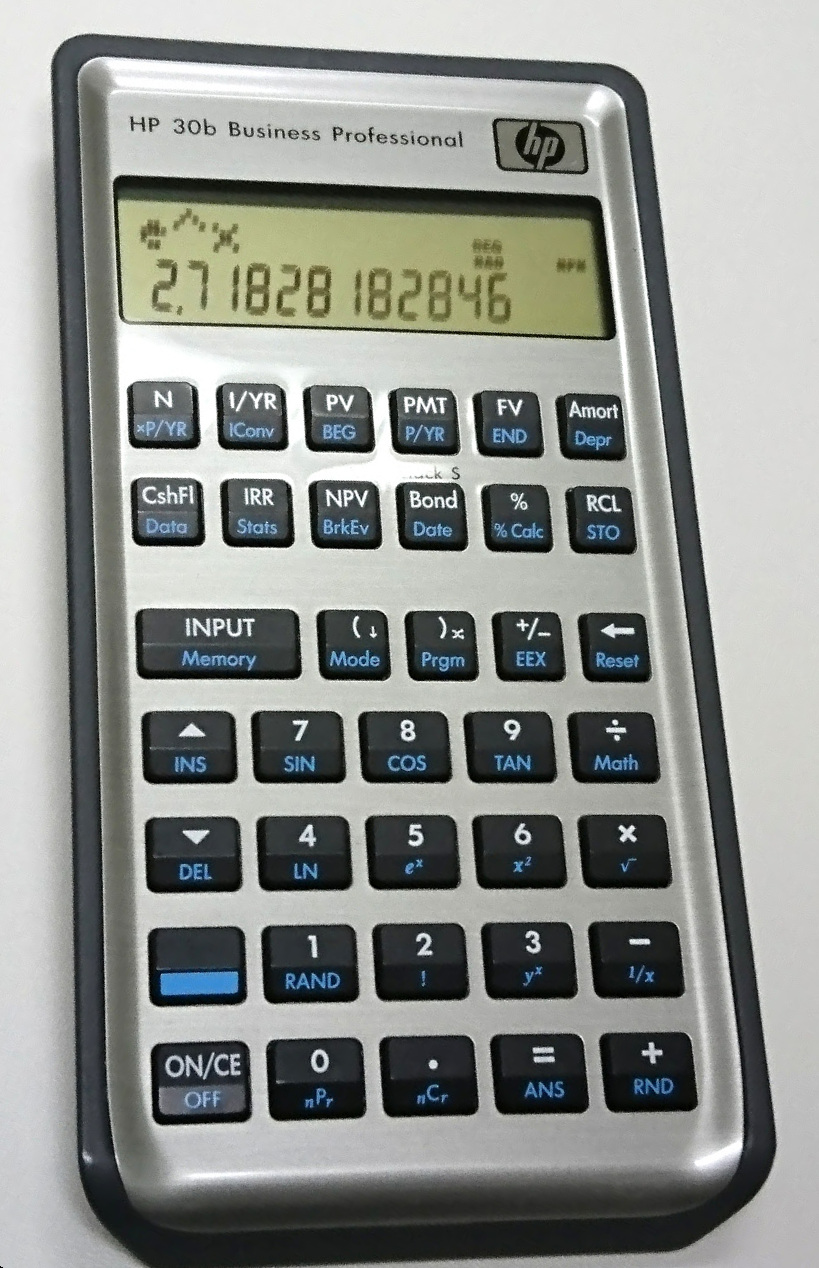
- HP 30b
- Type: Financial
- Manufacturer: Hewlett-Packard
- Introduced: 2010
- Discontinued: 2014
- Latest firmware: 2010-04-05
- Predecessor: HP 20b
- Cost: USD 20 – 50

Calculator
- Entry mode: RPN, Algebraic, Chain
- Display type: LCD seven-segment display dot-matrix display
- Display size: 12+3 digits and 8 characters

CPU
- Processor: 30 MHz Atmel AT91SAM7L128 (ARM7TDMI core)

Programming
- Memory register: 50 data and 10 registers
- Program steps: 290 bytes

Other
- Power supply: 2× CR2032 batteries (1 required, 1 optional)
- Power consumption: 0.25 mW
- Weight: 115 g
- Dimensions: 77 × 149 × 16 mm

The HP 30b (NW238AA, variously codenamed "Big Euro", "Mid Euro" and "Fox") is a programmable financial calculator from HP which was released on 7 January 2010. The HP 30b is an advanced version of the HP's prior model HP 20b. Featuring a two line alpha numeric display, ability to input data via Reverse Polish Notation, Algebraic and normal Chain algebraic methods, and twelve digit display.

This ARM powered calculator also has some limited scientific functions which is relatively rare in financial calculators. Also, it has a built in Black-Scholes Equation, for calculating theoretical premium for calls and puts, Modified Internal Rate of Return and Financial Management Rate of Return, a first.

The HP 30b is not allowed in any major exam like CFA Charter exam.

== HP 40b ==
At some point HP planned to release a HP 40b, a version of the HP 30b with added USB port, the capability to load precompiled programs into the calculator from the PC and to use the calculator as an external keypad for a PC. However, only a few prototypes were ever produced.

== WP 31S, WP 34S and WP 34C ==
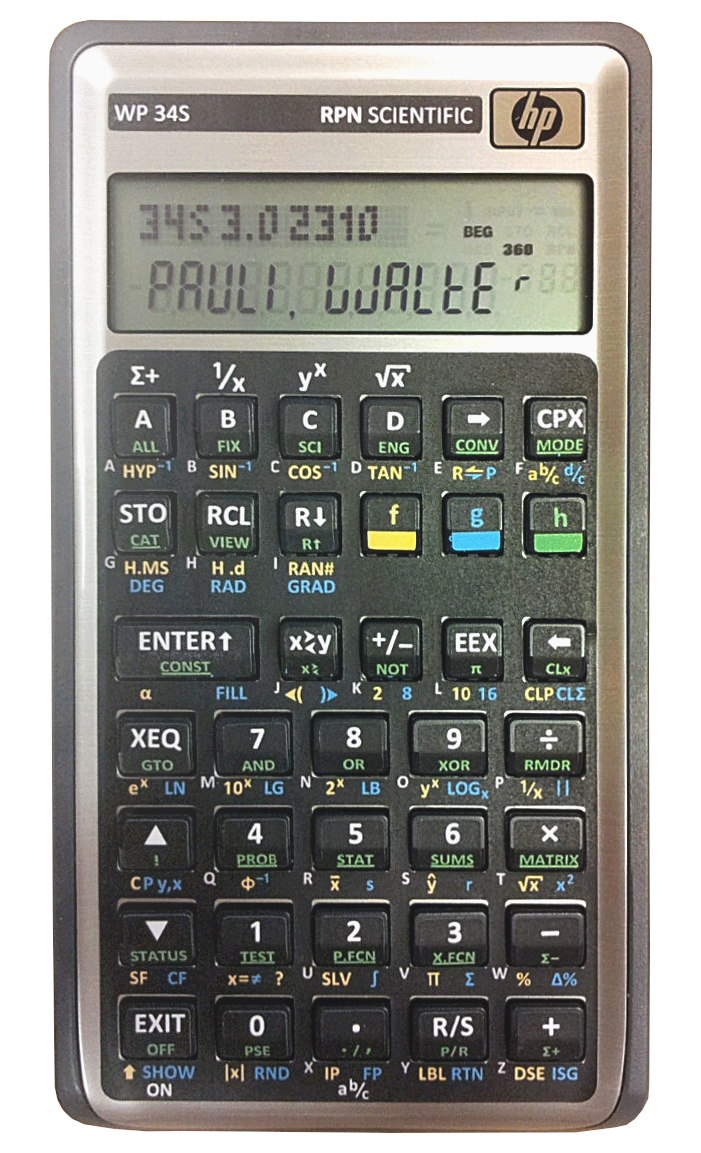
HP 30b with overlay for WP 34S

As with the HP 20b, the HP 30b's firmware can be overwritten ("flashed") using a computer and a special cable. Taking advantage of this facility, a team of HP calculator enthusiasts has produced a firmware for converting the 30b into a programmable scientific calculator. The resulting WP 34S (2011) firmware and user's manual can be downloaded free of charge, and a special serial cable and keypad overlay can be purchased for a nominal fee. The WP 34S was also being sold commercially. A firmware branch with a complex number lock mode is called WP 34C (2015). The WP 31S (2014) is a stripped-down version of the WP 34S. (The community-developed WP 43S, which is based on the SwissMicros DM42 hardware, is a successor to this project.)

== See also ==
- TI BA II Plus
- TI BA II Plus Professional
