= HP-22S =

Scientific calculator by Hewlett-Packard

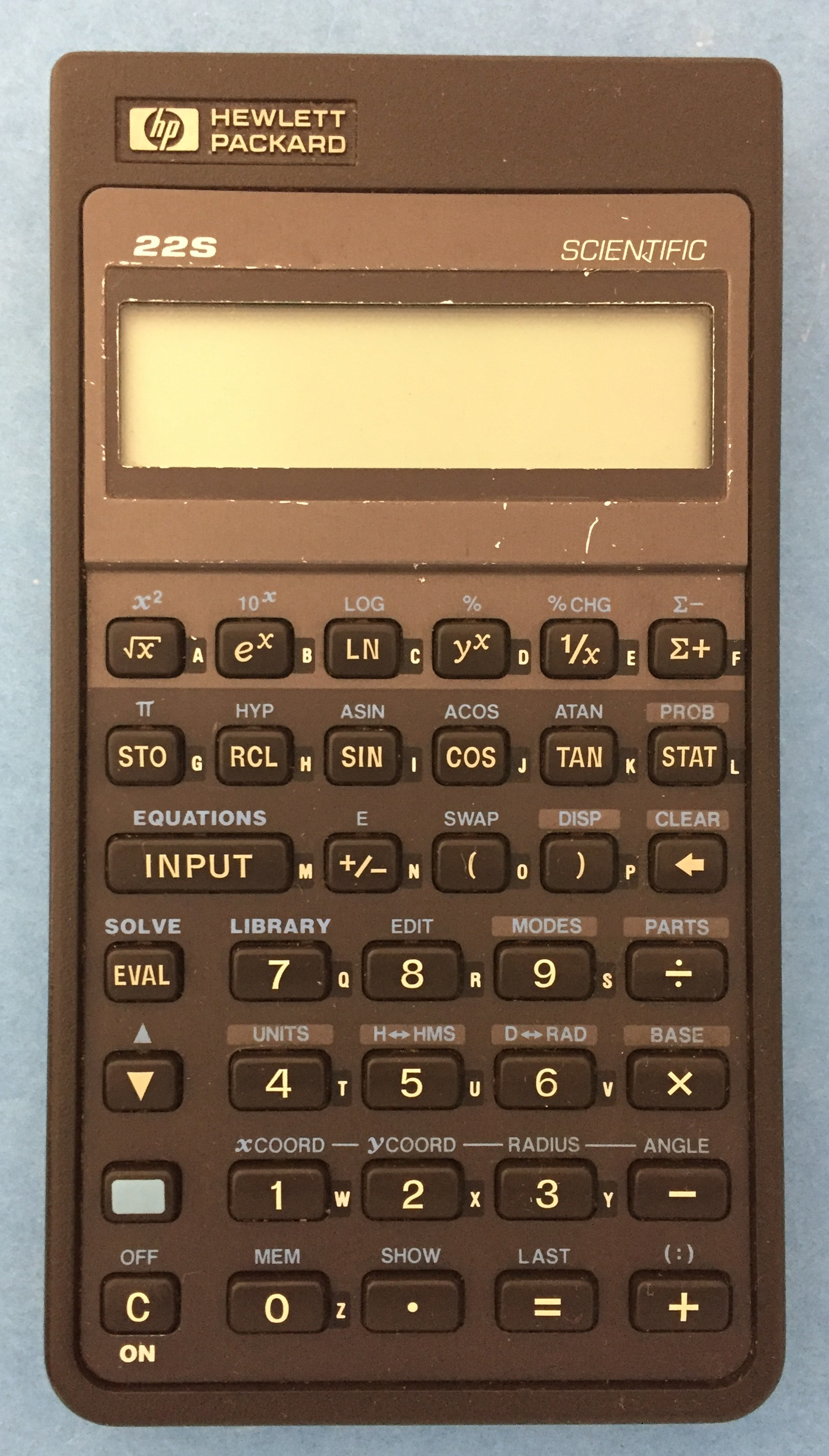
- HP-22S
- Type: Scientific
- Manufacturer: Hewlett-Packard
- Introduced: 1988

Calculator
- Entry mode: Infix
- Display type: Character-based dot-matrix display
- Display size: 1 line, 12 characters

CPU
- Processor: HP Saturn (Sacajawea)
- Frequency: 640 kHz

Programming
- Firmware memory: 16 KB of ROM

Other
- Power supply: 3×1.5V button cell batteries (Panasonic LR44, Duracell PX76A/675A or Energizer 357/303)
- Dimensions: 148×80×15mm

The HP-22S is an electronic calculator from the Hewlett-Packard company which is algebraic and scientific. This calculator is comparable to the HP-32S. A solver was included instead of programming. It had the same constraints as the 32S, lacking enough RAM for serious use. Functions available include TVM and unit conversions. Only single letter variable names are allowed. Marketed as a student calculator, the 22S uses infix notation rather than the reverse polish notation used on some higher-end HP calculators of the same era.

== Features ==
The HP-22S includes many of the typical features found in most scientific calculators:

- Trigonometric and hyperbolic functions
- Polar/rectangular coordinate conversion
- Probability functions and statistical calculators (mean and standard deviation, weighted mean, linear regression)
- Unit and base conversions

== Hardware ==
The 22S has the same physical form factor and 37-key keypad as other models in the Pioneer series. Introduced simultaneously with the HP-32S, it is based on the same hardware, with a single line character-based dot matrix display that can display both numerical and alphabetical characters. The CPU is an HP Saturn Sacajawea chip clocked at 640 kHz, making it slower than its higher-spec cousin, the HP-27S.

== Equation solving and equation library ==
HP's advertising for the 22S emphasized the equation solver and library of built-in equations. This feature allows a multi-variable equation to be entered by the user, and the equation solved for a particular unknown variable given the value of other variables.

For convenience the 22S includes a set of common mathematical and scientific formulae, including:

- Quadratic roots
- Kinetic energy
- Ideal gas law
- Fluid pressure
- Radioactive decay
- Time value of money

== See also ==
- List of Hewlett-Packard products: Pocket calculators
- HP calculators
