= HP-19B =

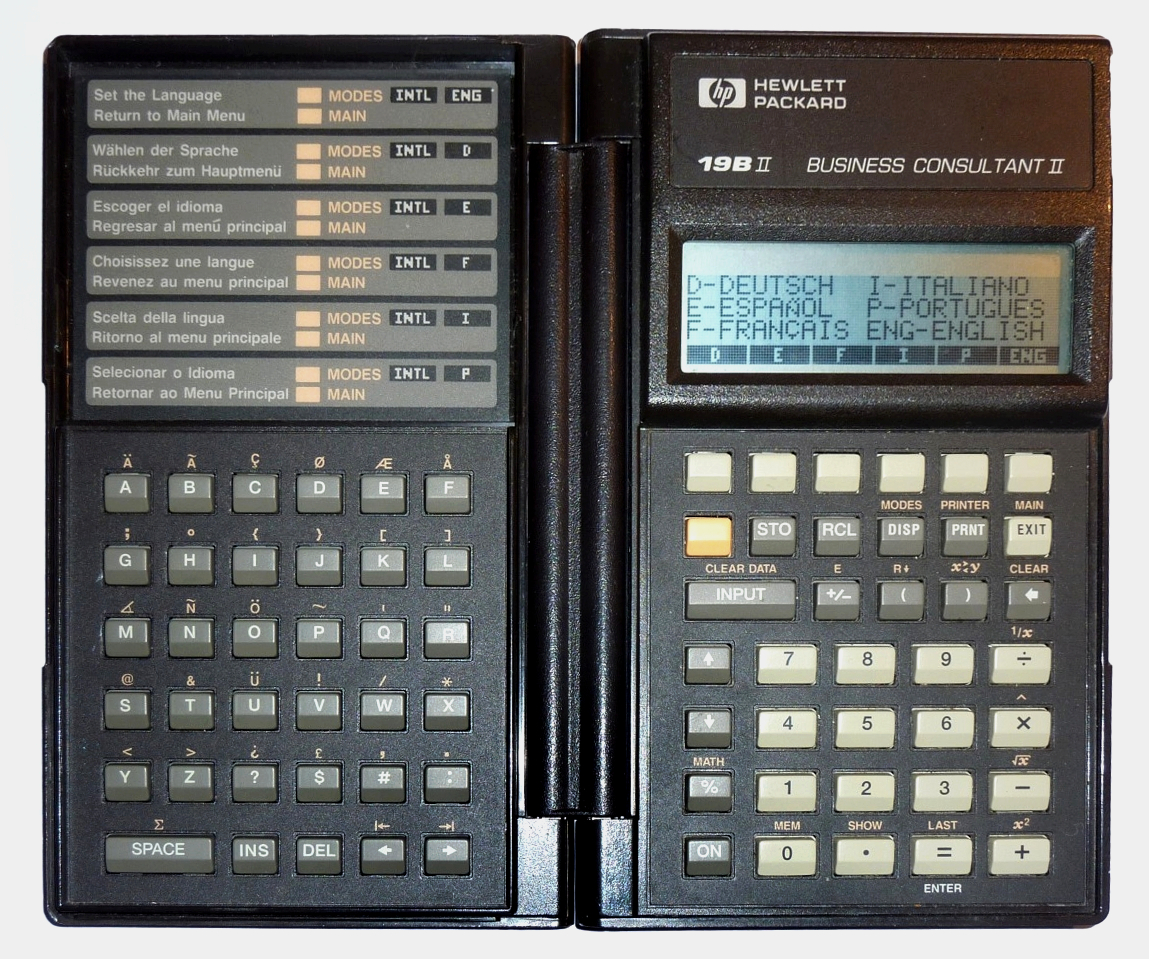
- HP-19B
- Type: Business
- Manufacturer: Hewlett-Packard
- Introduced: 1988
- Discontinued: 1990
- Cost: $110

Calculator
- Display type: LCD
- Display size: 132×32

Other
- Power consumption: 3×N 1.5 V batteries
- Dimensions: Length 15.9 cm, Width 9.4 cm (closed), 18.9 cm (open) Height 1.8 cm (closed).

HP-19B, introduced on 4 January 1988, along with the HP-17B, HP-27S and the HP-28S, and replaced by the HP-19BII (F1639A) in January 1990, was a simplified Hewlett Packard business model calculator, like the 17B. It had a clamshell design, like the HP-18C, HP-28C and 28S.

Two common issues with the clamshell case were the plastic surrounding the battery door would break under pressure from the batteries; and the ribbon connecting the two keyboards would begin to fail after numerous case openings.

The calculator included functions for solving financial calculations like time value of money, amortizing, interest rate conversion and cash flow. Business functionalities included percentage change, markup, currency exchange and unit conversions. It also had math capabilities such as trigonometry and graphing. Upscale functionality, at the time of release, included the ability to design your own problem solving equations and storing text directly in the calculator using the letter keyboard on the left side. The calculator could also print via a built-in infrared transmitter to a supported infrared printer such as the HP 82240A or HP 82240B; which allowed you to print out the generated graphs.

== See also ==
- List of HP calculators
