= Texas Instruments Business Analyst =

Series of financial calculators by Texas Instruments

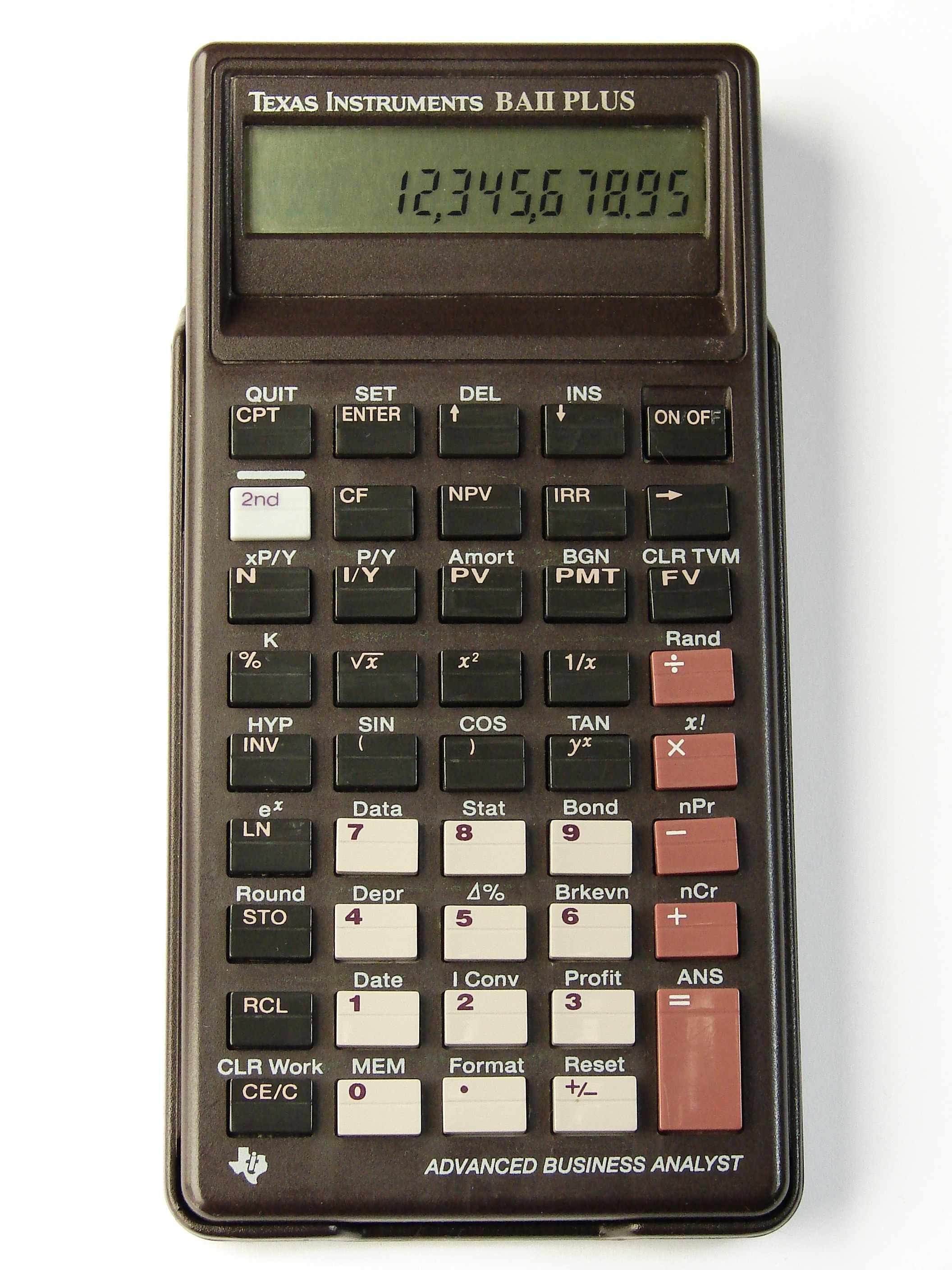
Texas Instruments BA II Plus from 1991.

The Texas Instruments Business Analyst series is a product line of financial calculators introduced in 1976. BA calculators provide time value of money functions and are widely used in accounting and other financial applications. Though originally designed specifically for financial use, current models also include basic scientific calculator and statistics functions. The BA series competes directly with other mid- to high-end financial calculators, particularly the HP-12C and other models from TI competitor Hewlett-Packard. There are two models in the product line: the BA II Plus (originally introduced in 1991) and the BA II Plus Professional (introduced in 2004).

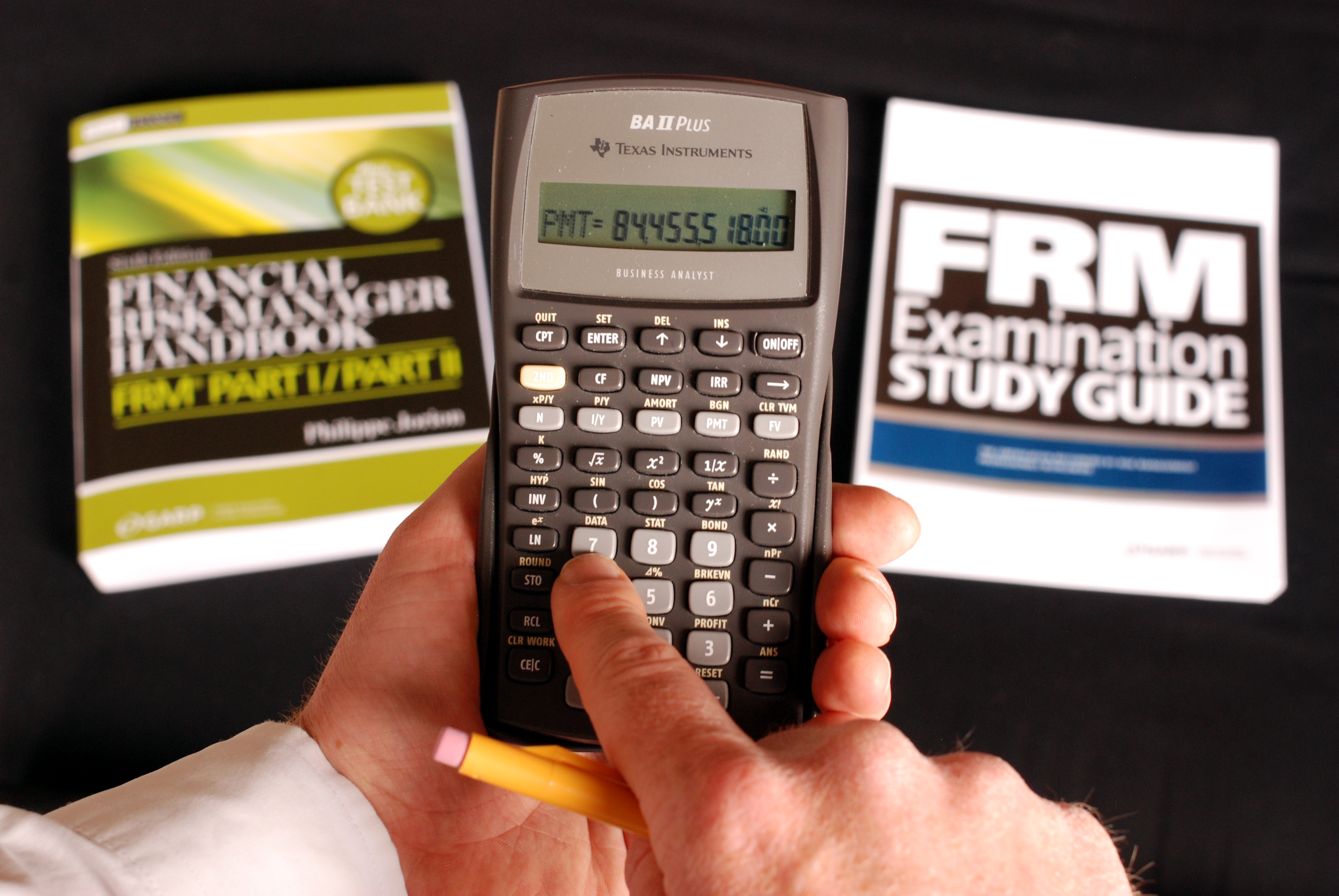
The BA II Plus is one of a handful of calculators permitted to be used in the CFA and FRM financial exams.

== BA II Plus ==
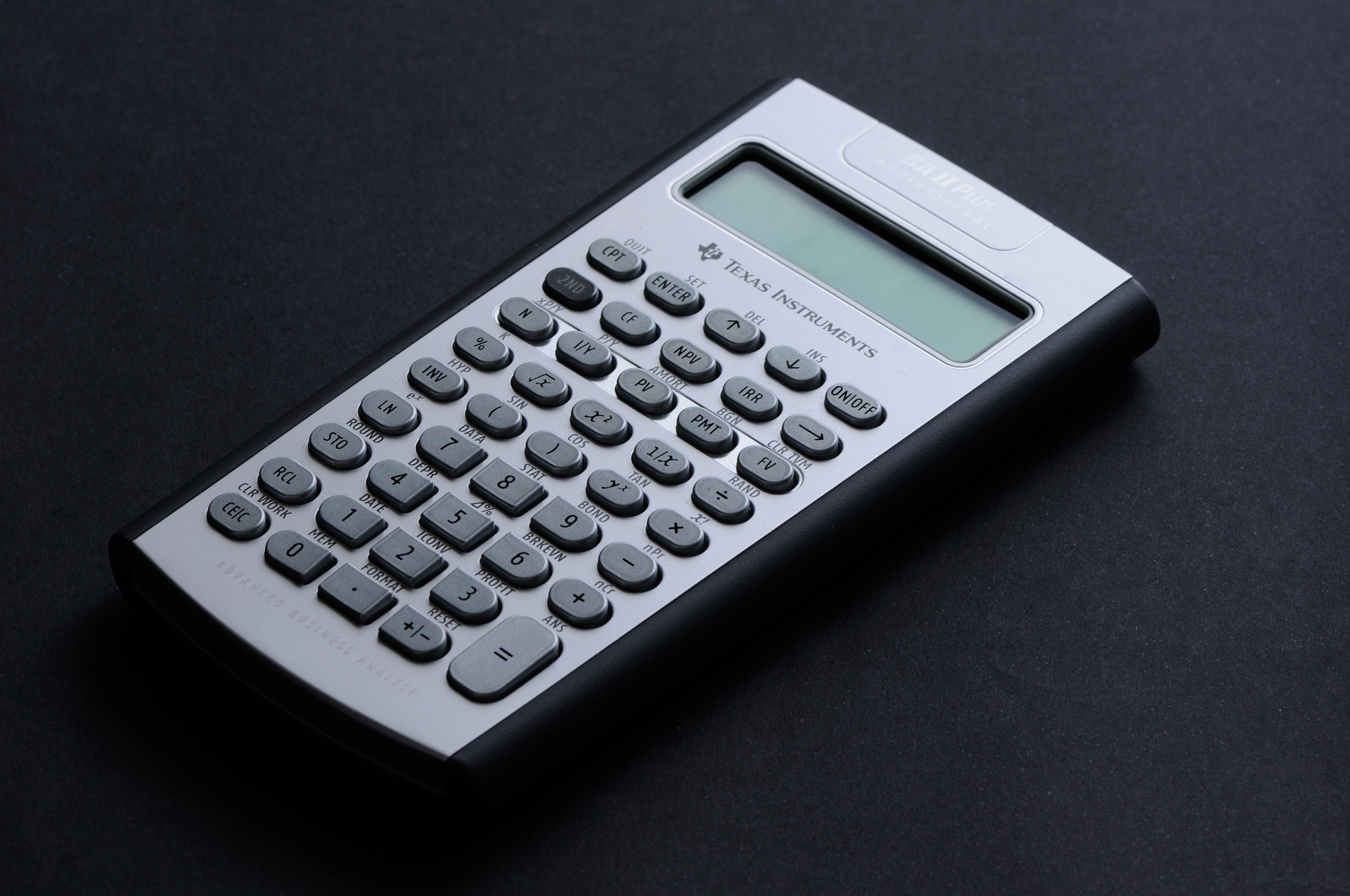
Texas Instruments BA II Plus Professional

The BA II Plus is the main financial calculator sold by Texas Instruments as of 2015. It provides basic scientific calculator functionality alongside its financial functions, and provides most of its financial functions in the form of worksheets, where values are input as variables in a table; when a computation is requested, the calculator plugs the values from the worksheet into the appropriate internal expression and returns the requested result. It has been available in three case designs, based respectively on 1989's TI-68, 1999's TI-30X IIS, and the 2013 revision of the TI-30Xa. It is permitted on several professional exams, including the international Chartered Financial Analyst exam. The 2014 revision includes larger display numbers, but the computation functions remain the same as previous models. It has not been made available in a solar-powered model.

The BA II Plus Professional is an upgrade to the base model introduced in 2004, including several additional worksheet functions such as net future value and modified internal rate of return.

Several companies, most notably Texas Instruments itself, have released emulators of the BA II Plus for various mobile operating systems. In addition, Stokes Publishing formerly sold The Educator Business, a calculator designed for use on overhead projectors that emulated the BA II Plus.

An app on the Apple App Store is also available by Texas Instruments mirroring the Calculators design and functionality.

== BA-20 Profit Manager ==
From 1986 to sometime after 2010, TI produced the BA-20 (also known outside North America as the TI-620), which was a basic desktop calculator with the addition of dedicated cost, margin, and sell calculation buttons. Early models included a built-in clock module, which was removed for the 1998 revision. The short-lived TI-10 Profit Guide had similar functions in a pocket calculator size.

== BA-35 Financial Calculator ==
The BA-35 was targeted at students studying finance and was available from 1985 to the late 2000s. Though it contained a full set of TVM functions, it lacked the advanced scientific calculator functions of later models of the BA II. It was the most affordable calculator for time-value-of-money calculations

Features:

- Preprogrammed financial and accounting functions, including time-value-of-money and compound interest calculations.
- Capability for recalling time-value-of-money values as well as annuity due operations.
- Amortization balance and payment-to-interest calculations.
- Annual Percentage Rate (APR) to Effective Rate (EFF) interest conversions.
- One-variable statistics with frequencies. Calculates mean, sample standard deviation, and population standard deviation.
- Cost-sell-margin and mark-up calculations.
- Easy to use payment and other time-value-of-money calculations make this a perfect calculator for real estate agents and management consultants.
- Solar-cell powered.

== See also ==
- HP 20b
- HP 30b
