= HP 20b =

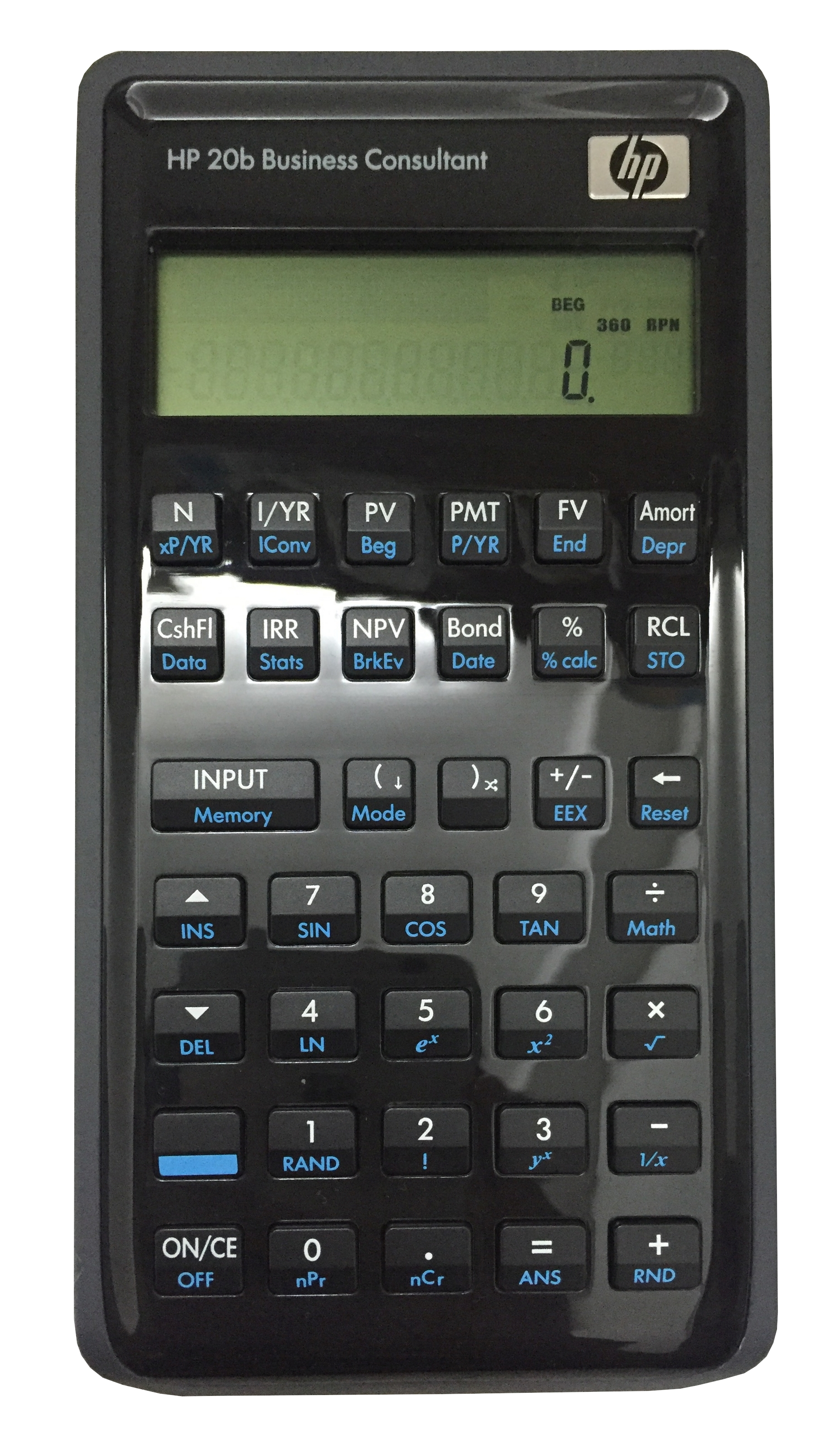
- HP 20b
- Type: Financial
- Manufacturer: Hewlett-Packard
- Introduced: 2008
- Discontinued: 2014
- Latest firmware: 2010-04-05
- Successor: HP 30b
- Cost: USD 15 - 40

Calculator
- Entry mode: RPN, Algebraic, Chain
- Display type: LCD seven-segment display dot-matrix display
- Display size: 12+3 digits and 8 characters

CPU
- Processor: 30 MHz Atmel AT91SAM7L128 (ARM7TDMI core)

Programming
- Memory register: 50 pairs of statistical data + 10 registers

Other
- Power supply: 2× CR 2032 batteries (1 required, 1 optional)
- Power consumption: 0.25 mW
- Weight: 113.2 g
- Dimensions: 14.92 × 7.70 × 1.6 cm

The HP 20b Business Consultant (F2219A, codenamed "Little Euro") is a financial calculator introduced in 2008 by Hewlett-Packard. Its function is similar to HP 10bII and includes scientific and statistical functions.

== Hardware specification ==
The HP 20b uses a 2 lines display with the first line an 8 character scrolling display and 11 indicators and the second line for 12+3 digit display. It also uses 2 CR2032 batteries, an Atmel AT91SAM7L128 30 MHz processor. The processor's serial interface is accessible from under the battery cover to allow the firmware to be updated using a special cable from HP.

== Functions ==
The HP 20b contains functions similar to the HP 10bII, with financial functions including: TVM, IRR, NPV, NUS ("Net Uniform Series"), amortization, depreciation, bonds, yield and accrued interest, interest conversion, list-based cashflow analysis, cashflows, break-even analysis.

Math/Statistics functions include: list-base, 1 and 2 variable statistics, mean, standard deviation, population deviation, standard error, forecasting, correlations and covariance, +, -, ×, ÷, %, 1/x, +/-, scientific notation, n!, combinations, permutations, rounding, random numbers, LOG, LN, 10×, PL, square root, trigonometry, probability.

For input modes, it supports RPN, Chain and Algebraic input.

It also included several added features include: date calculation, display format and language preferences, memory functions, editing, scroll keys.

== Criticism ==
Many users claim that they dislike the model because it lacks the feedback when pressing the keys, and the menus make things complicated.

== Examination approval ==
The HP 20b is approved by the Hong Kong Examinations and Assessment Authority and can be used in Hong Kong Certificate of Education Examination of 2009 or later.

The HP 20b is approved by the Global Association of Risk Professionals (GARP) and can be used for the Financial Risk Manager (FRM) certification exam.

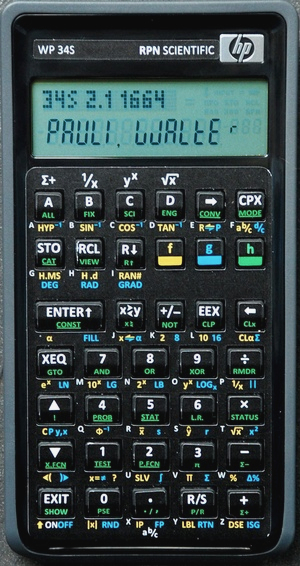
HP 20b with overlay for WP 34s

== Repurposing ==
Along with the HP 30b, the HP 20b calculator is particularly conducive to repurposing, since both the hardware and software are made public by HP. Several projects have been started around reusing this calculator for other purposes. The most advanced is the WP 34S, a programmable scientific calculator that combines the functionality of the HP-42S and HP-16C and includes many other novel features and functions. A firmware branch with a complex number lock mode is called WP 34C. The WP 31S is a stripped-down non-programmable version of the WP 34S, designed to be easier to use.

== See also ==
- TI BA II Plus
- TI BA II Plus Professional
