= HP-28 series =

Series of graphing calculators produced by Hewlett-Packard

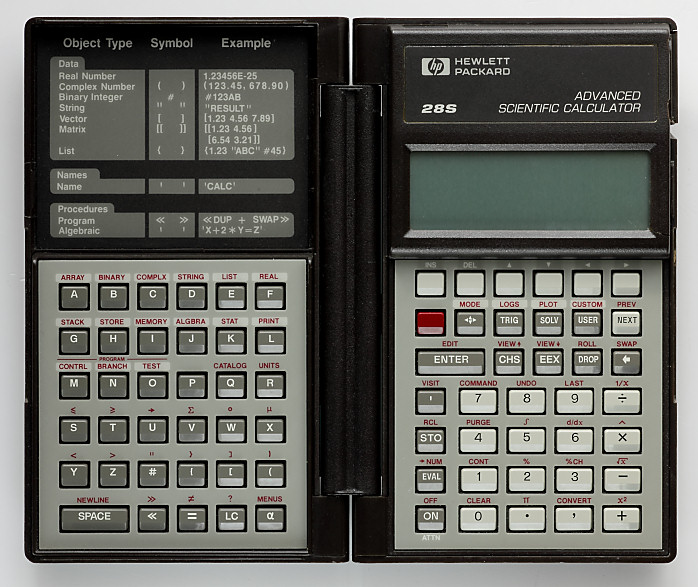
HP-28S

The HP-28C and HP-28S were two graphing calculators produced by Hewlett-Packard from 1986 to 1992. The HP-28C was the first handheld calculator capable of solving equations symbolically. They were replaced by the HP 48 series of calculators, which grew from the menu-driven RPL programming language interface first introduced in these HP-28 series.

== History ==
Two models were produced, the HP-28C came first in 1987 with 2 kilobytes of usable RAM, and was the first handheld calculator with a Computer Algebra System. A year later, the more common HP-28S was released with 32 KB of RAM and a directory system for filing variables, functions, and programs. The HP-28C used a Saturn processor running at 640 kHz whereas the HP-28S used a custom chip containing an improved Saturn processor core codenamed Lewis and running at 1 MHz.

The HP-28C was the last HP model introduced with the suffix "C" in its model designation – a practice which HP had started with the HP-25C back in 1976. The "C" had distinguished those models as having continuous memory. However, by 1988 that capability had become so common on calculators that it was no longer a feature of distinction, as it was an assumed characteristic of all serious scientific and business calculators. So beginning with the HP-28S, HP-17B, HP-19B, and HP-27S, the feature suffix "C" was replaced with a class suffix which was more meaningful in the market: "S" for Scientific, "B" for Business, and later (in 1993) "G" for Graphic.

== Design ==
=== Clamshell ===
The HP-28 calculators shared a flip-open ("clamshell") case. On the left side of the flip, there is an alphabetic keyboard (in alphabetic order). On the right was a typical scientific keyboard layout.

=== LCD ===
The display was a 137×32 LCD dot matrix, usually displaying four lines of information (3 stack/command lines, plus one softkey label line).

=== Lack of computer interface ===
Among the drawbacks of the HP-28 was the lack of a computer interface. This meant that stored information could only be entered through the keypad and not backed up.

=== Weak battery cover ===
This model (and the HP-19B series that used the same clamshell design and internals) had one design problem that affected many units: the springs inside the unit that made contact with its three N-sized batteries made a considerably strong force, and the notches on the case in which the lid edges slid were too thin and shallow. Even if the case itself was sturdy enough, those notches were under extreme pressure, most especially while the user was opening or closing the lid (such as during the replacement of the batteries). As the lid edges were made of a harder metal, the plastic notches in the case were prone to cracking or breaking, even in carefully kept devices. Surviving examples of the earlier versions of this calculator frequently have rubber bands around or tape over the cover to hold it in place (including the image attached to this article). This defect was later remedied on the HP-19BII, by putting the battery cover underneath the chassis.

== Emulators ==
- RPN 28x Calc - A scientific calculator with a nostalgic, HP-28S-like interface for iPad.
- Halcyon Calc - for iPhone, iPod Touch and iPad.
- Emu42 - A Windows-based open-source emulator for the Hewlett-Packard Pioneer series of calculators (HP-10B, HP-14B, HP-17B, HP-17BII, HP-20S, HP-21S, HP-22S, HP-32S, HP-32SII, HP-27S and HP-42S) and the HP-19BII and HP-28S clamshell calculators.

== See also ==
- HP calculators
- Comparison of HP graphing calculators
- Graphing calculator
- HP 82240A character set (Modified HP Roman-8)
