= HP-27S =

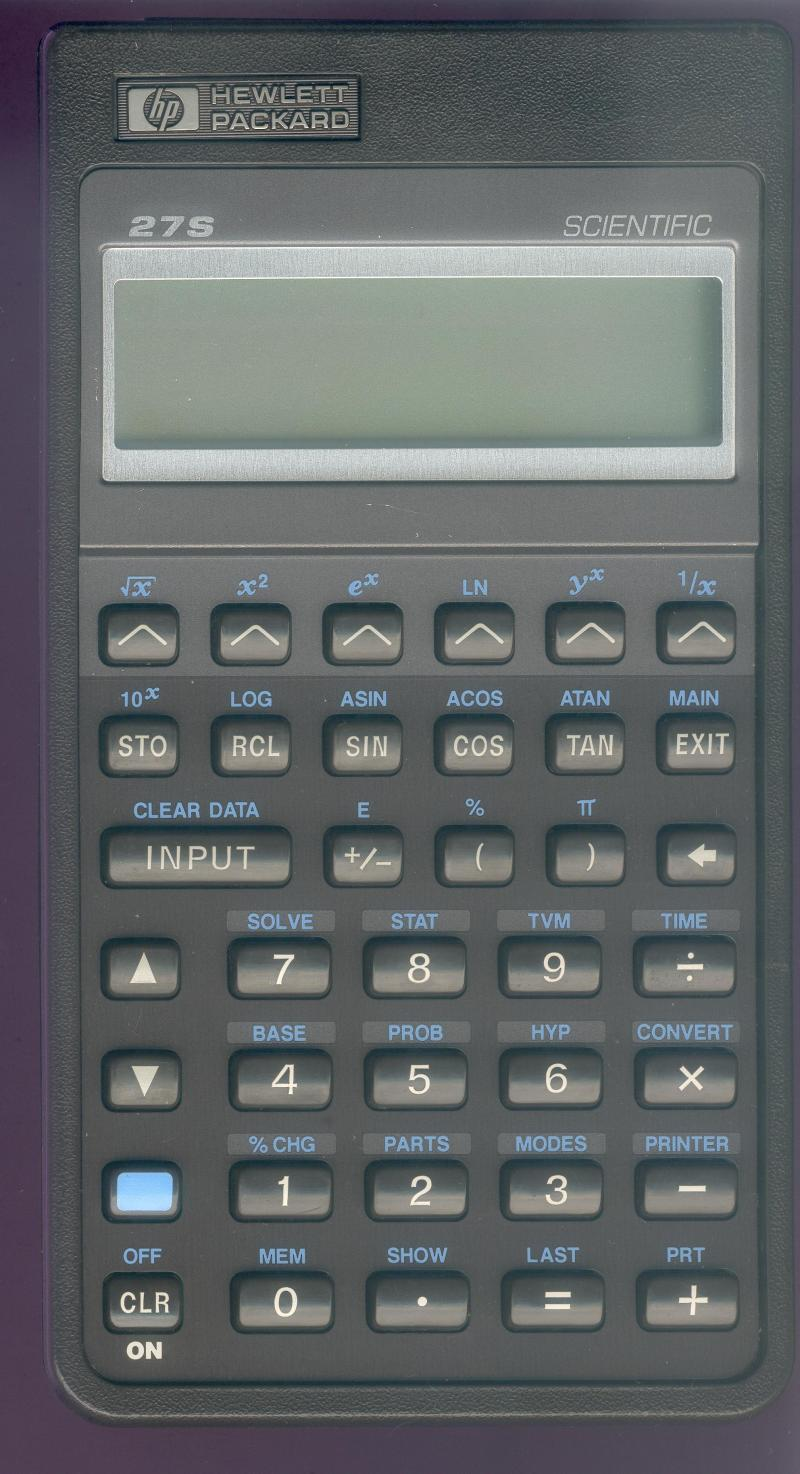
- HP-27S
- Type: Scientific
- Manufacturer: Hewlett-Packard
- Introduced: 1988
- Discontinued: 1990-1993

Calculator
- Entry mode: Infix
- Precision: 12 display digits (15 digits internally), exponent ±499
- Display type: LCD dot-matrix
- Display size: 2 lines, 22 characters, 131×16 pixels

CPU
- Processor: Saturn (Lewis)
- Frequency: 1 MHz

Programming
- User memory: 8 KB
- Firmware memory: 64 KB of ROM

Interfaces
- Ports: IR (Infrared) printing

Other
- Power supply: 3×1.5V button cell batteries (Panasonic LR44, Duracell PX76A/675A or Energizer 357/303)
- Weight: 6 oz (170 g)
- Dimensions: 148×80×15mm

The HP-27S was a pocket calculator produced by Hewlett-Packard, introduced in 1988, and discontinued between 1990 and 1993 (sources vary). It was the first HP scientific calculator to use algebraic entry instead of RPN, and though it was labelled scientific, it also included features associated with specialized business calculators.

The device featured standard scientific functions, including statistics and probability. Equations could be stored in memory, and solved and integrated for specified variables. Binary, octal, and hexadecimal number bases could be used. Business features included a real-time clock and calendar with up to ten appointments (each with a 22 character message string), as well as functions such as time value of money calculations.

The 27S was not programmable in the conventional way, but it included an advanced formula-storage system with programming features. Within stored formulas, sub-formulas could be defined and later referred to by name. Loops and conditional execution could also be embedded within formulas.

== Hardware ==
The 27S has the same physical form factor and 37-key keypad as other models in the Pioneer series. Introduced at the same time as the HP-17B, it shares the same internal hardware.

The calculator had 6,900 bytes of usable memory, shared among variables and formulas. Ten storage registers R0 through R9 could each hold one number.

Its hardware features included a dot-matrix display of two rows of 22 characters. Depending on context, either the top row was used to display the current expression or a message, or the bottom row was used to show menu options, which could be selected with the corresponding keys. An infra-red transmitter was also included, allowing the machine to be used with a compatible printer, such as the HP 82240B. A beeper could be used to sound date/time alarms.

== See also ==
- List of Hewlett-Packard products: Pocket calculators
- HP calculators
