= HP-32S =

Programmable RPN Scientific Calculator

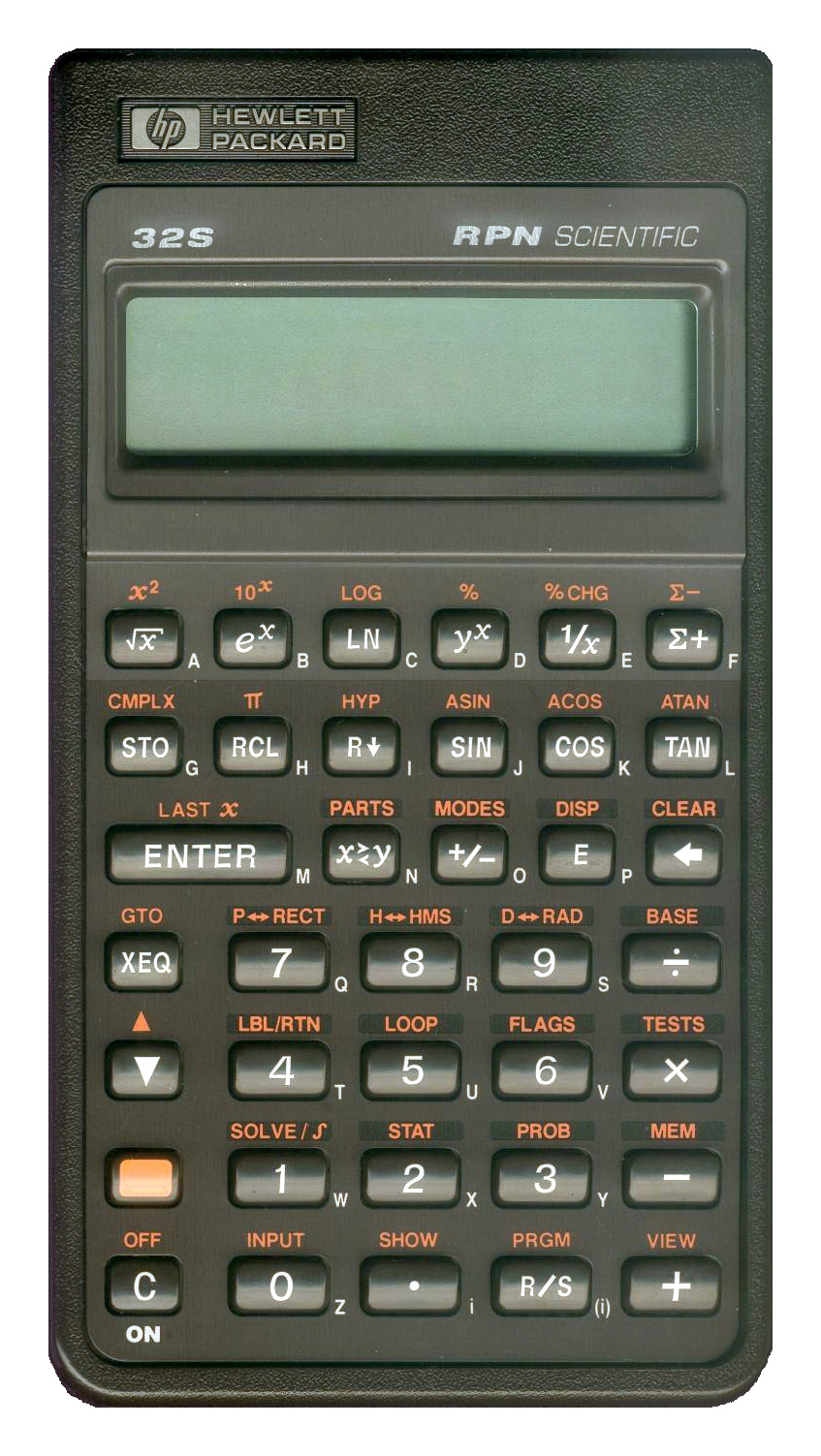
- HP-32S Scientific RPN Calculator
- Type: Programmable Scientific
- Manufacturer: Hewlett-Packard
- Introduced: 1987
- Discontinued: 1995
- Successor: HP 32sii

Calculator
- Entry mode: RPN
- Precision: 12 digits
- Display type: Monochrome
- Display size: 12 7x5 displays (7x60 pixels)

CPU
- Processor: Saturn
- Frequency: 640kHz

Programming
- Programming language(s): Keystroke
- User memory: 390 bytes

Other
- Power supply: 3x LR44
- Weight: 5oz
- Dimensions: 5.83"x3.15"

The HP-32S (codenamed "Leonardo") was a programmable reverse Polish notation scientific calculator introduced by Hewlett-Packard in 1987. It was succeeded by the HP-32SII scientific calculator.

== HP-32SII ==
HP-32SII
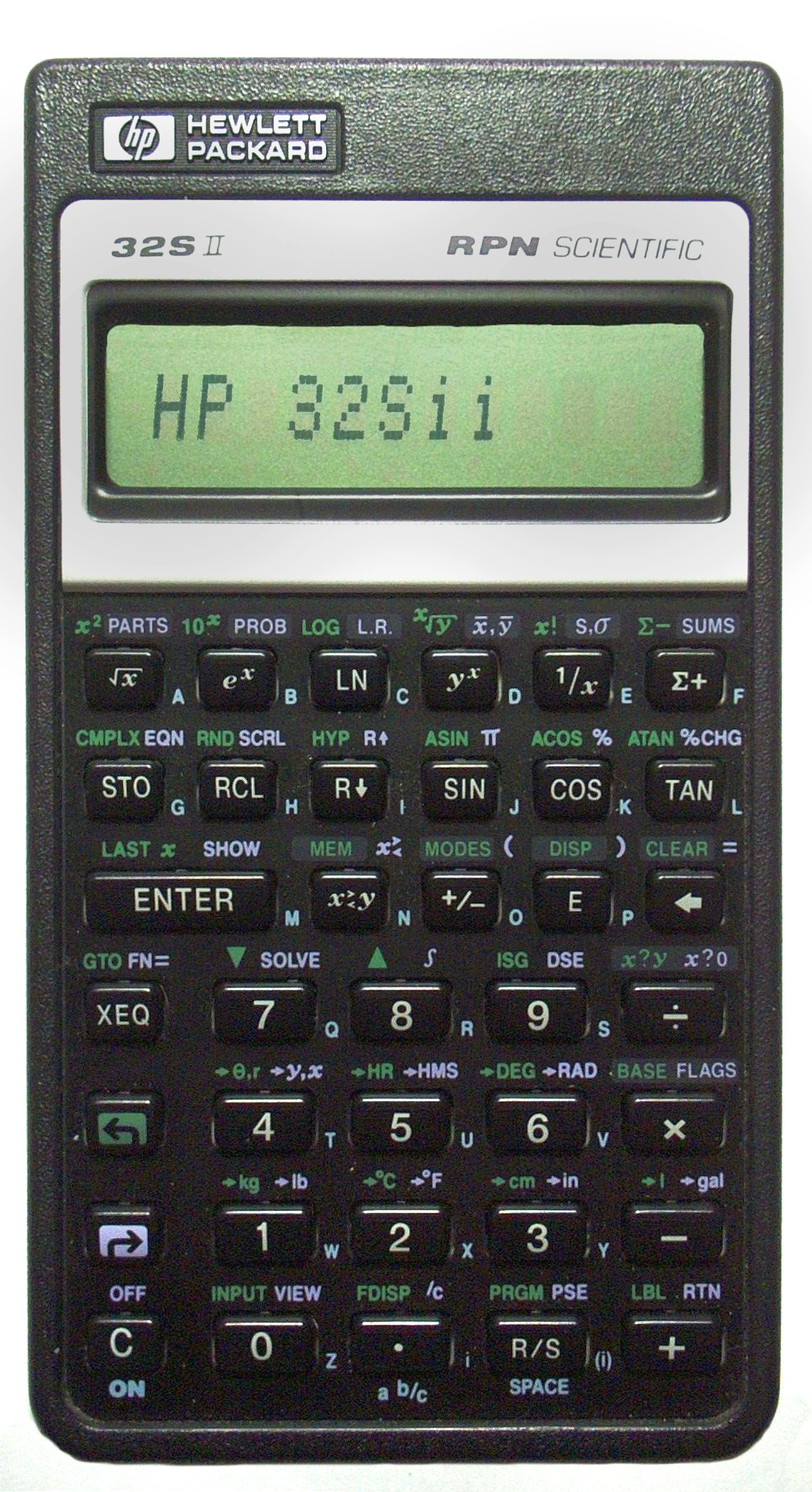
- HP-32SII Scientific RPN Calculator
- Type: Programmable Scientific
- Manufacturer: Hewlett-Packard
- Introduced: 1991
- Discontinued: 2002

Calculator
- Entry mode: RPN
- Precision: 12 digits
- Display type: Monochrome
- Display size: 12 7x5 displays (7x60 pixels)

CPU
- Processor: Saturn
- Frequency: 640kHz

Programming
- Programming language(s): Keystroke
- User memory: 384 bytes

Other
- Power supply: 3x LR44
- Weight: 6oz
- Dimensions: 148×85×15.5 mm

The HP 32sII was introduced in 1991 and was produced until 2002. It added a second shift key, which allowed quicker access to many functions that were previously buried in menus. The 32sII also added fraction support, accessed by pressing the decimal point key twice. The 32sII also updated the solver to algebraic entry, versus the original RPN entry on the 32s. The original color scheme (orange left-shift and blue right-shift keys) was similar to that of the HP 32s and HP 48SX, but in 1999 HP changed the color scheme to a dark green left-shift and lilac right-shift.

The quick availability of functions on the HP 32sII led it to become the calculator of choice for the Texas UIL calculator competitions.

== See also ==
- HP calculators
- List of Hewlett-Packard pocket calculators
- Hp 32s Museum page (external link)
