= Financial calculator =

Electronic calculator

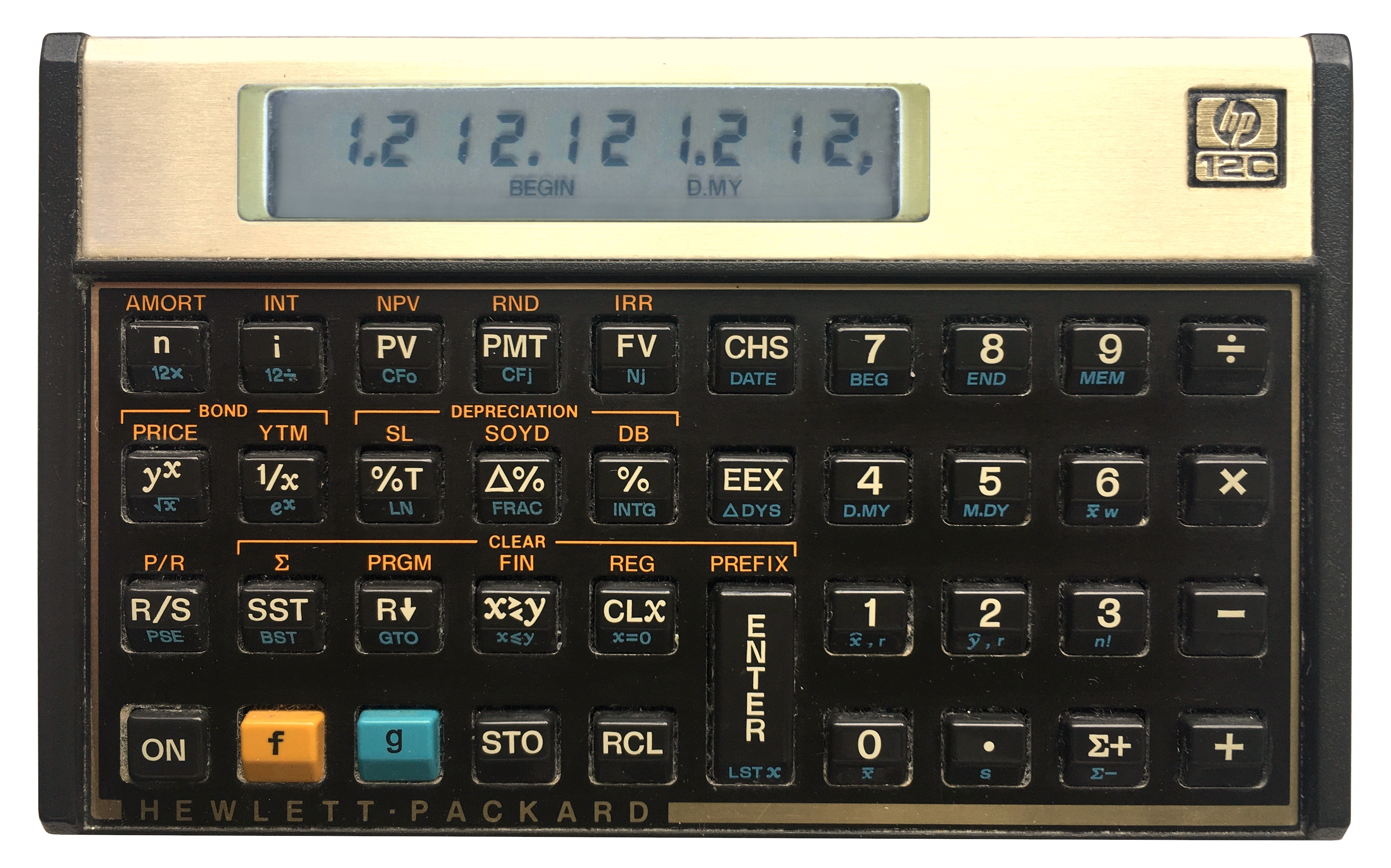
HP-12C financial calculator including functions to calculate depreciation and net present value.

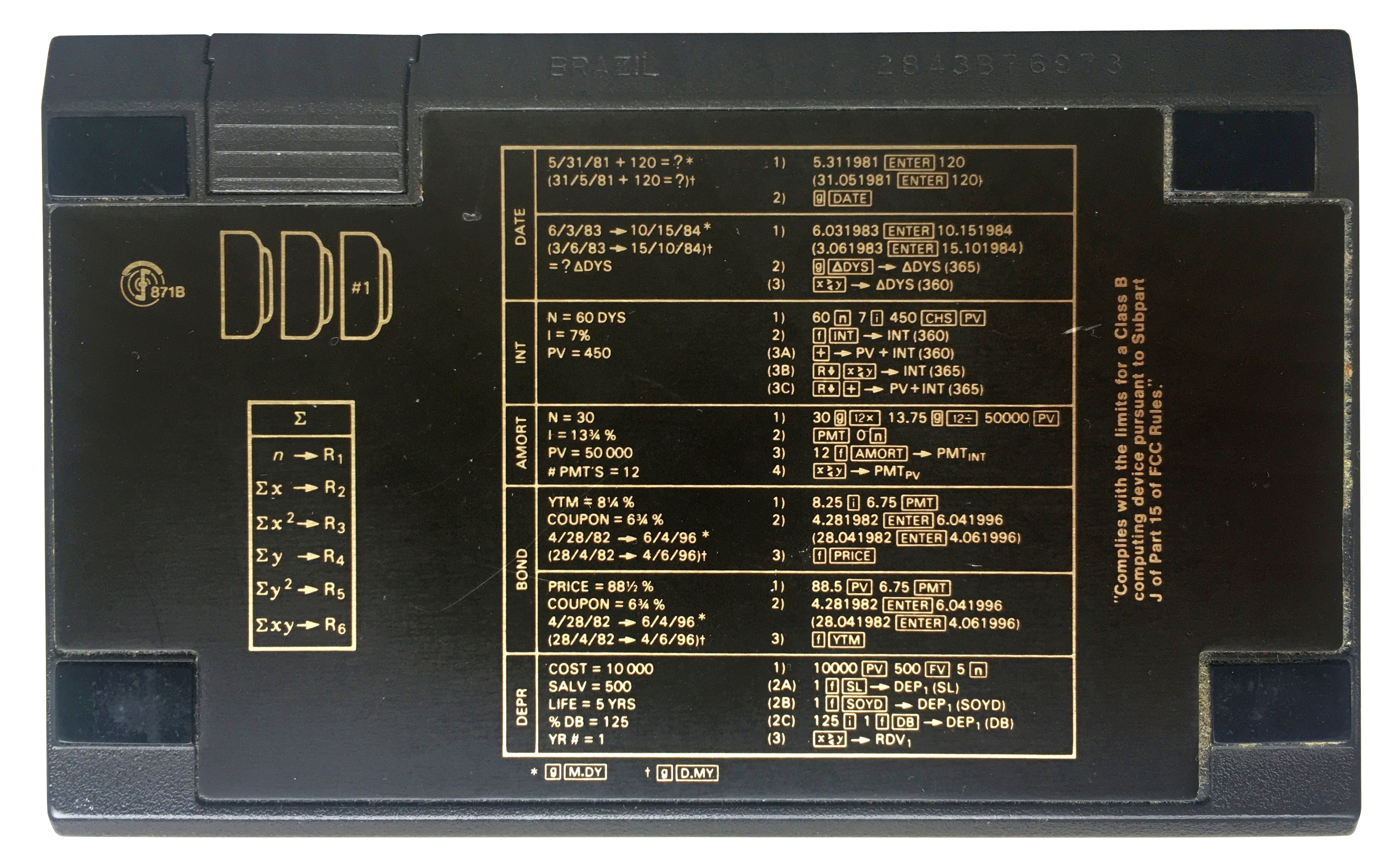
Backside of the above HP-12C with some use cases with the respective keys to be pressed for frequent tasks from the field of finance

A financial calculator or business calculator is an electronic calculator that performs financial functions commonly needed in business and commerce communities (simple interest, compound interest, cash flow, amortization, conversion, cost/sell/margin, depreciation etc.). It has standalone keys for many financial calculations and functions, making such calculations more direct than on standard calculators. It may be user programmable, allowing the user to add functions that the manufacturer has not provided by default.

Examples of financial calculators are the HP 12C, HP-10B and the TI BA II.

A wide number of graphing calculators, like the Casio FX-9860GII, the Texas Instruments TI-89 Titanium, and the Hewlett Packard HP 48gII include complex financial calculations, as well as spreadsheet applications such as Microsoft Excel, LibreOffice Calc, and Google Sheets.
