= HP-42S =

Scientific calculator by Hewlett-Packard

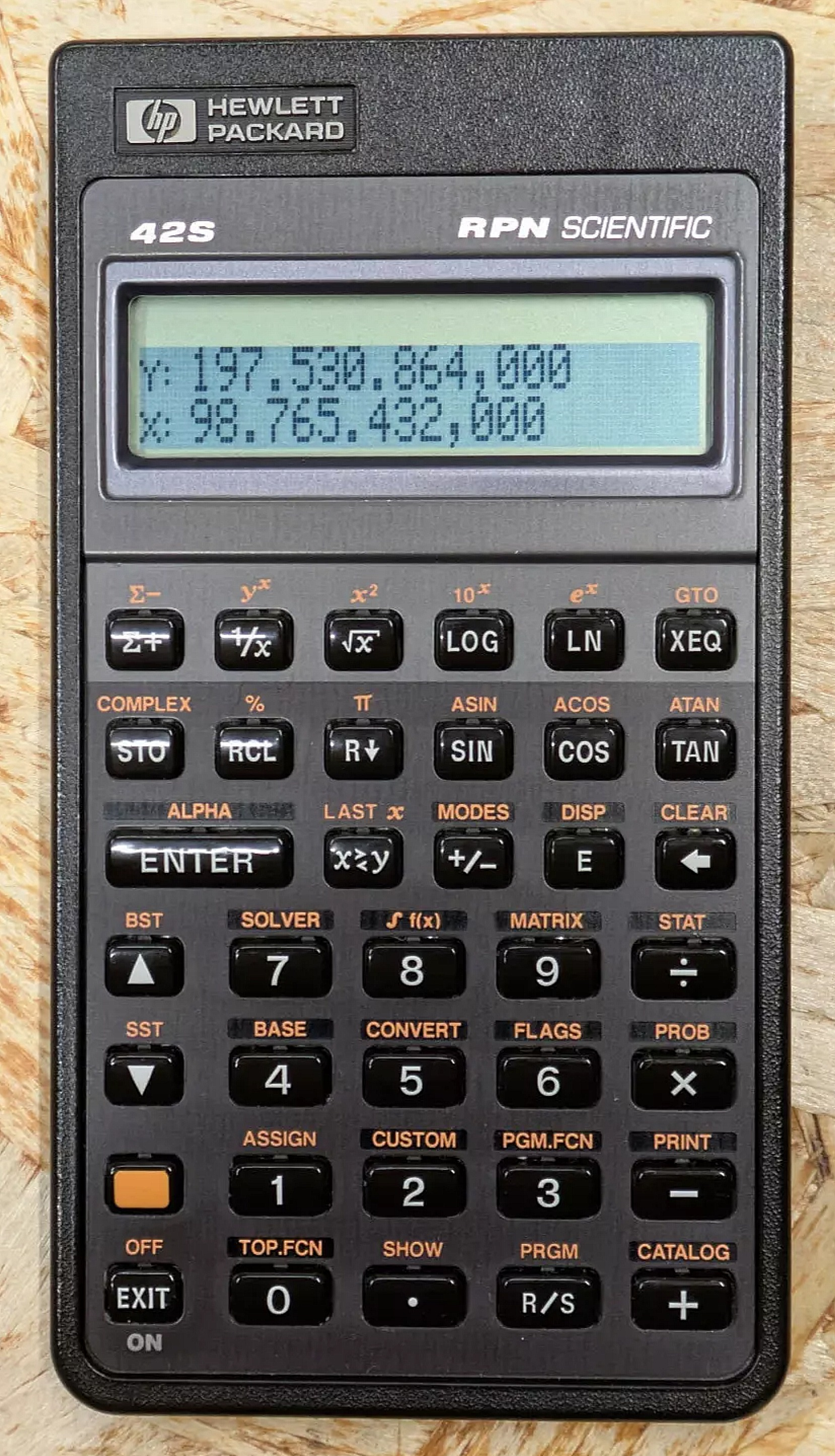
- HP-42S
- Type: Programmable scientific
- Manufacturer: Hewlett-Packard
- Introduced: 1988
- Discontinued: 1995

Calculator
- Entry mode: RPN
- Precision: 12 display digits (15 digits internally), exponent ±499
- Display type: LCD dot-matrix
- Display size: 2 lines, 22 characters, 131×16 pixels

CPU
- Processor: Saturn (Lewis)

Programming
- Programming language(s): RPN key stroke (fully merged)
- Firmware memory: 64 KB of ROM
- Program steps: 7200

Interfaces
- Ports: IR (Infrared) printing

Other
- Power supply: 3×1.5 V button cell batteries (Panasonic LR44, Duracell PX76A/675A or Energizer 357/303)
- Weight: 6 oz (170 g)
- Dimensions: 148×80×15 mm

The HP-42S RPN Scientific is a programmable RPN Scientific hand held calculator introduced by Hewlett-Packard in 1988. It is a popular calculator designed for science and engineering students.

== Overview ==
Perhaps the HP-42S was to be released as a replacement for the aging HP-41 series as it is designed to be compatible with all programs written for the HP-41. Since it lacked expandability, and lacked any real I/O ability, both key features of the HP-41 series, it was marketed as an HP-15C replacement.

The 42S, however, has a much smaller form factor than the 41, and features many more built-in functions, such as a matrix editor, complex number support, an equation solver, user-defined menus, and basic graphing capabilities (the 42S can draw graphs only by programs). Additionally, it features a two-line dot matrix display, which made stack manipulation easier to understand.

Production of the 42S ended in 1995.

== Specifications ==
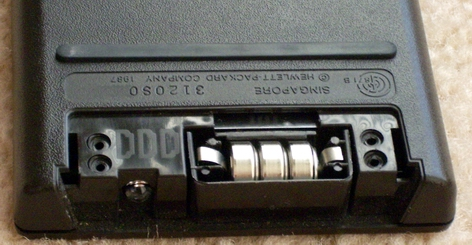
HP-42S battery compartment and the IR diode

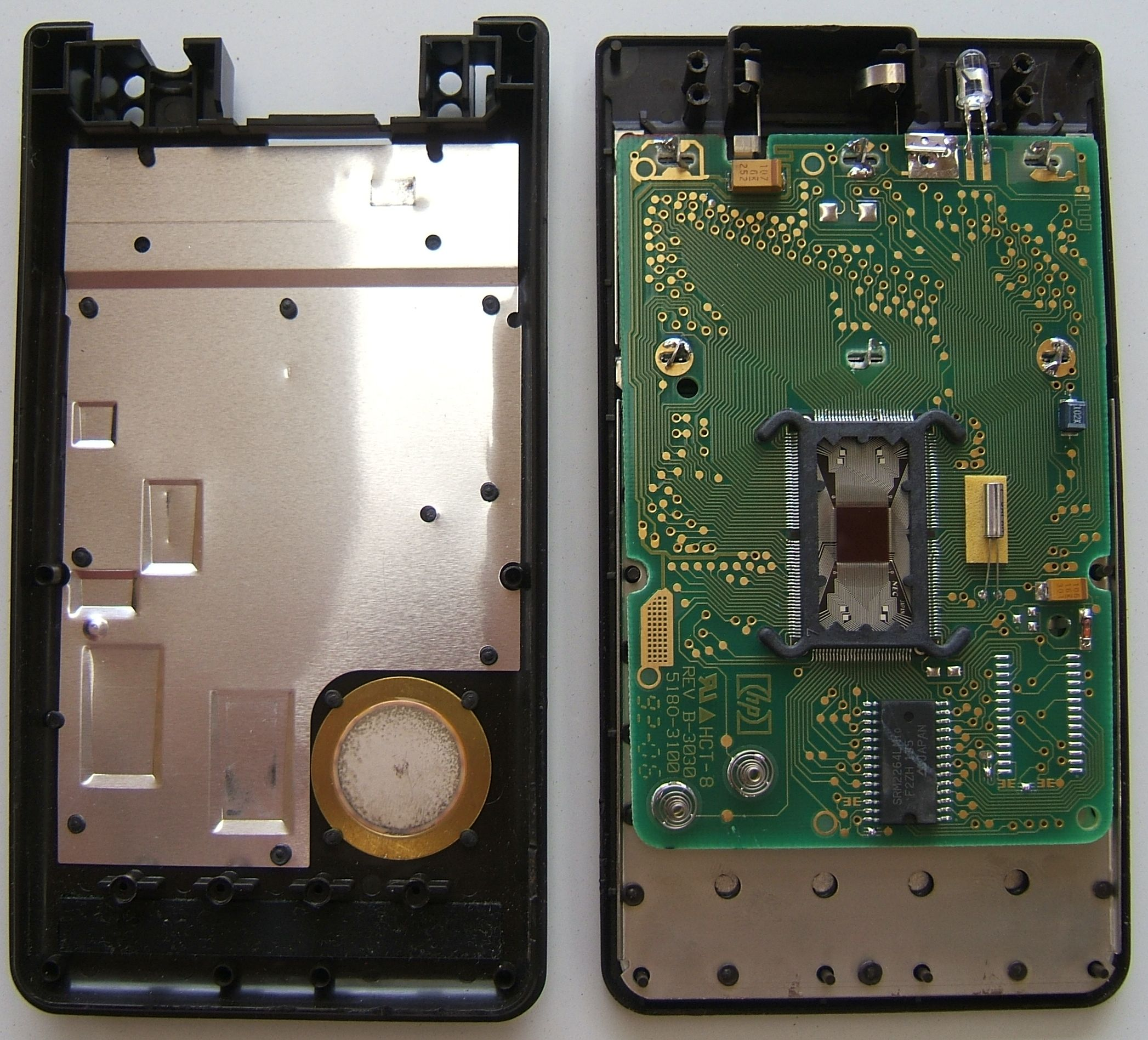
HP-42S calculator internal teardown

- Series: Pioneer
- Code Name: Davinci
- Introduction: 1988-10-31
- 64 KB of ROM
- 8 KB of RAM
- Functions: Over 350
- Expandability: Officially no other than IR printing (32 KB memory upgrade and over-clocking hardware hacks are possible)
- Peripherals: HP 82240A infrared printer

== Features ==
- All basic scientific functions (including hyperbolic functions)
- Statistics (including curve fitting and forecasting)
- Probability (including factorial, random numbers and Gamma function)
- Equation solver (root finder) that can solve for any variable in an equation
- Numerical integration for calculating definite integrals
- Matrix operations (including a matrix editor, dot product, cross product and solver for simultaneous linear equations)
- Complex numbers (including polar coordinates representation)
- Vector functions
- Named variables, registers and binary flags
- Graphic display with graphics functions and adjustable contrast
- Menus with submenus and mode settings (also custom programmable) that use the bottom line of the display to label the top row of keys
- Sound (piezoelectric beeper)
- Base conversion, integer arithmetic and binary and logic manipulation of numbers in binary, octal, decimal and hexadecimal systems
- Catalogs for reviewing and using items stored in memory
- Programmability (keystroke programming with branching, loops, tests and flags)
- The ability to run programs written for the HP-41C series of calculators

== Programming ==
The HP-42S is keystroke-programmable, meaning that it can remember and later execute sequences of keystrokes to solve particular problems of interest to the user. The HP-42S uses a superset of the HP-41CX FOCAL language.

All programs are stored in one continuous program space, and may be created and edited by switching to programming mode, using the PRGM key. Subroutines are enclosed in LBL/Label (name of subroutine) and RTN/Return (halts execution unless it is in a subroutine in which case it returns to the caller). Keystrokes (of functions) are enclosed between LBL and RTN or .END.

In a running program, a GTO label causes program execution to branch to the specified label and continue running at that line. Executing a GTO instruction from the keyboard moves the program pointer to the corresponding label. No program lines are executed.

XEQ is used in much the same way with one important difference: after an XEQ instruction has transferred execution to the specified label, the next RTN (return) or END instruction causes the program to branch back to the instruction that immediately follows the XEQ instruction. Programs/Subroutines can also be executed with the help XEQ label (Execute) key. The important difference between the XEQ and GTO is that XEQ executes the label and returns to previous subroutine and continues execution from the line following XEQ, whereas GTO branches to the label specified and doesn't return.

GTO.. packs the current subroutines and moves to new program space.GTO.nnnn can be used to reach a particular line of program.

=== Programming examples ===
A simple program to calculate area of circle

Step	Instruction	Comment
00	{ 6-Byte Prgm }	
01	LBLAREA	Start of program "AREA"
02	INPUTR	Prompts for Value of R and stores it in R
03	X↑2	Squares the value in X register
04	PI	Puts π on the stack
05	×	Multiplies values in X and Y register
END or RTN	Returns control (and result in X) to either the user or to a calling program.	

Program instructions like STOP, PROMPT, INPUT halt the program execution, which can be continued by pressing R/S.

VIEW is used to view contents of a register, For example R in the above example.

=== Using Integral and Equation Solver ===
It is necessary to write a program or subroutine that evaluates f(x) for the function which needs to be solved or integrated. Variables used in program should be declared using MVAR

Here is a sample program to solve the equation °F = (9/5×°C) + 32

Step	Instruction	Comment
00	{ 31-Byte Prgm }	
01	LBLTEMP	Start of program "TEMP"
02	MVARF	Declares F as a variable for solver
03	MVARC	Declares C as a variable for solver
04	RCLF	Recall F
05	9	
06	5	
07	÷	
08	RCLC	Recall C
09	×	
10	-	
11	32	
12	-	
END or RTN	Returns control (and result in X) to either the user or to a calling program.	

After, accessing the solver using Shift 7 (SOLVER ), select program TEMP.

In a similar way, expressions can be integrated. After selecting the variable of integration, enter the lower limit and then press on LLIM, similarly input ULIM (upper limit) and ACC (accuracy).

== Emulators ==
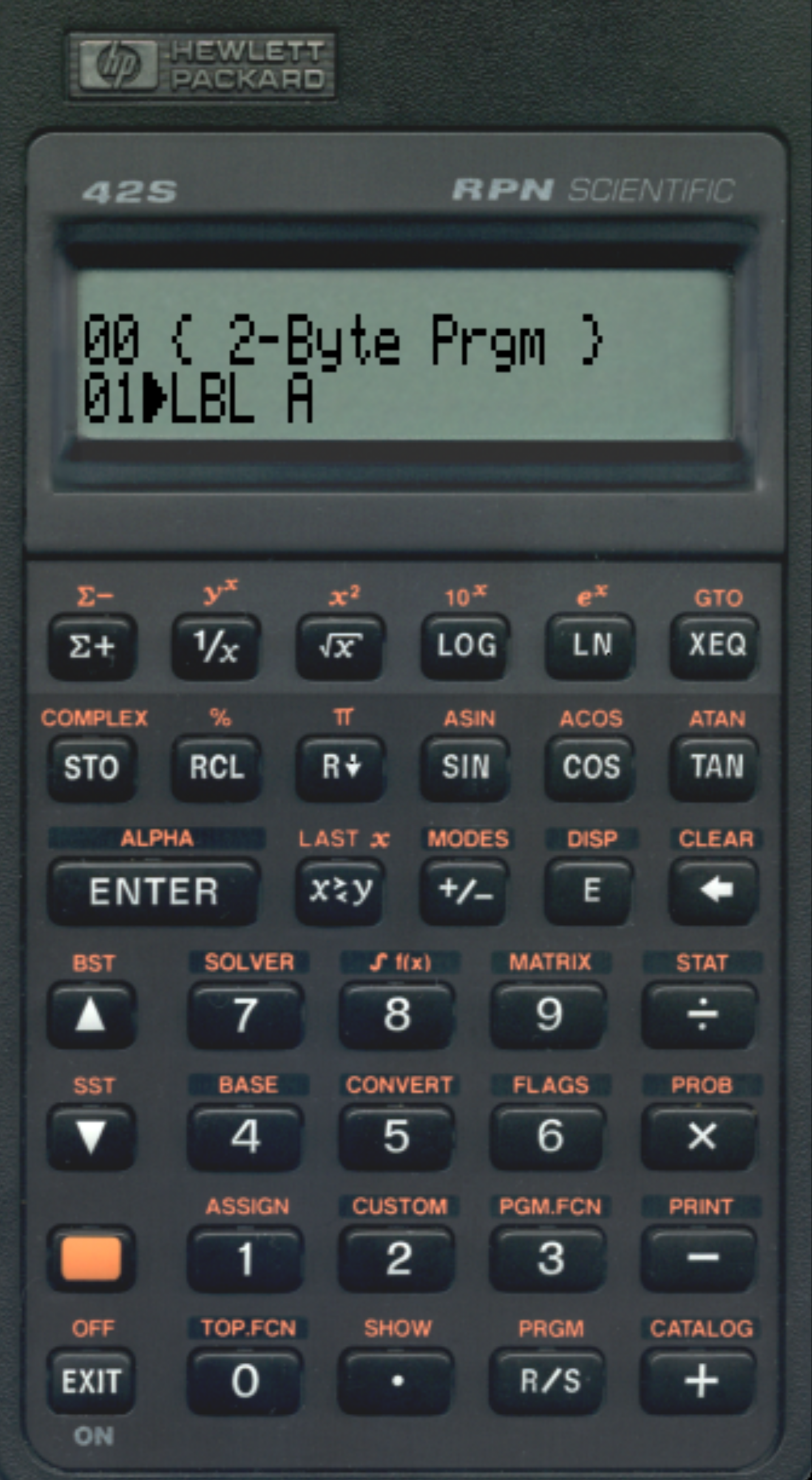
Emu 42

HP 42s can be accessed through Android Emulators like Emu42 and Free42.

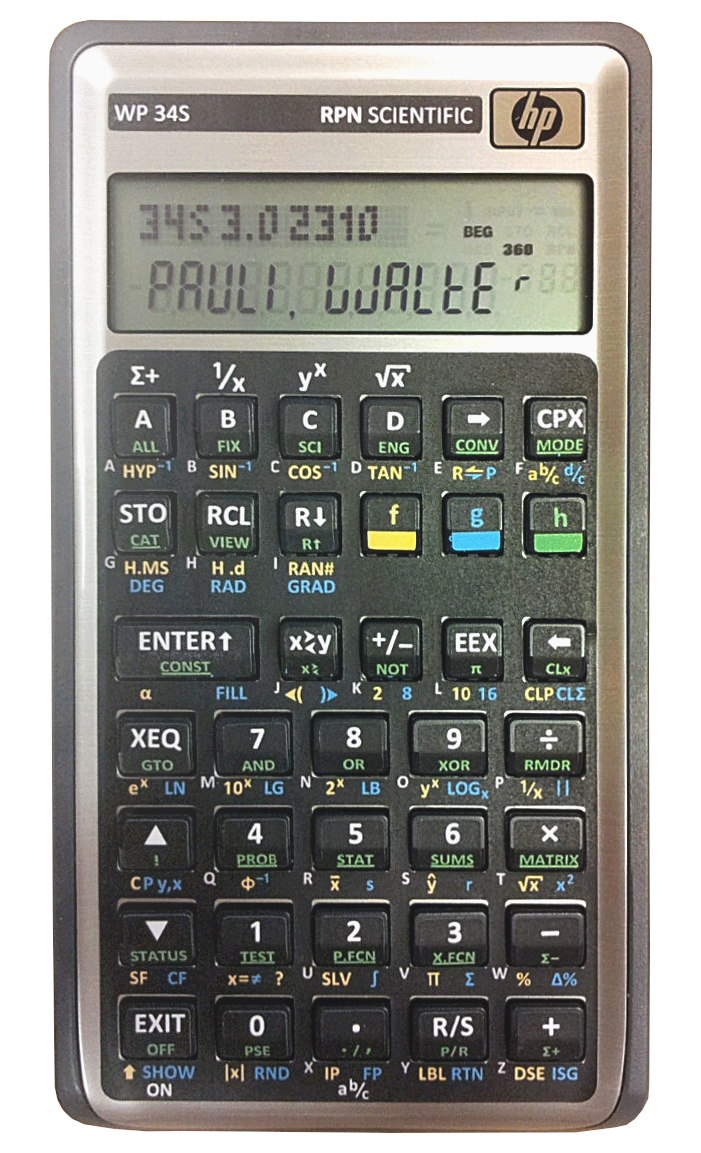
WP 34s

== Reference Books ==
Guides and Collections of Keystroke Programs

Documentation for the HP 42S calculator at hpcalc.org

- HP-42S Owner's Manual
- HP-42S Programming Examples & Techniques
- Step-by-Step Solutions: Electrical Engineering (42S)
- Step-by-Step Solutions: Mechanical Engineering (42S)
- Advanced Circuit Analysis with the HP-42S
- An Easy Course in Using the HP-42S

Educational Texts on RPN calculators

- Algorithms for RPN Calculators
- Scientific Analysis on the Pocket Calculator
- Engineering Statistics with a Programmable Calculator
- Applied Mathematical Physics with Programmable Pocket Calculators
- Mathematical Astronomy with a Pocket Calculator
- Handbook of Electronic Design and Analysis Procedures using Programmable Calculators
- Calculator Programs for Chemical Engineers(Vol 1 & 2)

Collection of Algorithms/Keystroke Programs for HP 41/HP 42S

- Software Library for HP 41 Programs(Compatible with HP 42S)

== See also ==
- FOCAL character set
- Comparison of HP graphing calculators
- HP calculators
- List of Hewlett-Packard pocket calculators
- NOMAS (support)
