= HP-10 =

HP-10 or variant, may refer to:

- HP10, a postcode for High Wycombe
- Hewlett-Packard HP-10, handheld printing adding machine, manufactured 1977-1979
- HP-10C, a calculator in the Hewlett-Packard Voyager series
- HP 10s, Hewlett Packard student scientific calculator
- HP-10B, Hewlett Packard student business calculator
- Schreder Airmate HP-10, glider

== See also ==
- HP (disambiguation)
