= HP-15C =

Programmable scientific calculator produced by Hewlett-Packard

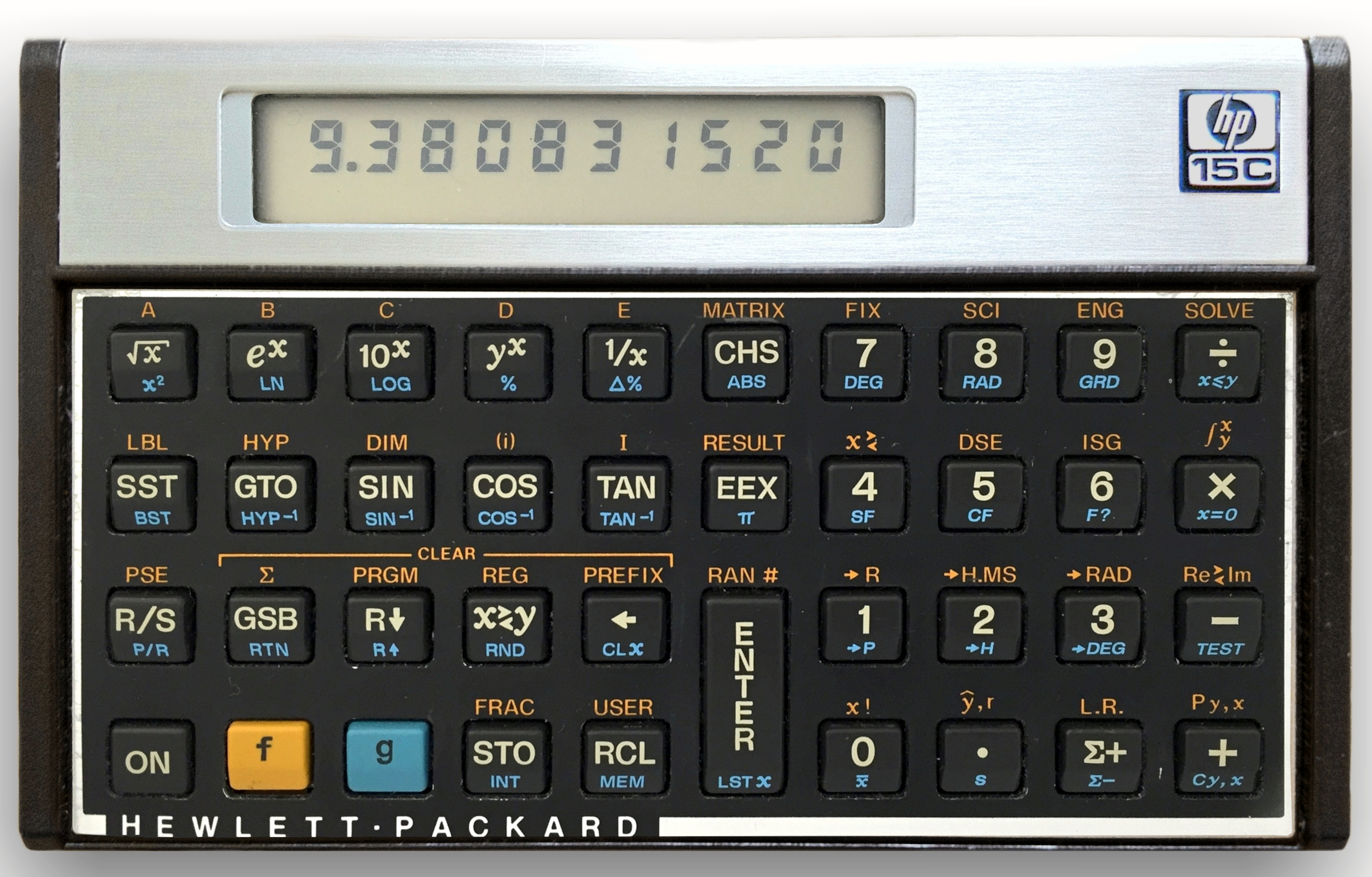
- HP-15C
- Type: Programmable scientific
- Manufacturer: Hewlett-Packard
- Introduced: 1982
- Discontinued: 1989
- Cost: USD 135 (Original) USD 99.99 – USD 179.99 (15C LE)

Calculator
- Entry mode: RPN
- Display type: LCD seven-segment display
- Display size: 10 digits

CPU
- Processor: HP Nut core (1LF5 / 1LM2 / 1LQ9) / ARM7TDMI core (Atmel AT91SAM7L128) (15C LE)

Programming
- Programming language(s): Keystroke programmable (fully merged)
- Memory register: 2…66 registers (R0…R9, R.0/R10…R.9/R20, R21…R65) plus RI, X, Y, Z, T, LAST X
- Program steps: 0…448 lines

Other
- Power consumption: 0.25 mW
- Weight: 113 g
- Dimensions: 128 × 79 × 15 mm

The HP-15C is a high-end scientific programmable calculator of Hewlett-Packard's Voyager series produced between 1982 and 1989. The "C" in the name refers to the continuous memory, such that the calculator retains its state when switched off.

== Models ==
=== HP-15C ===
The HP-15C is a high-end scientific pocket calculator with a root-solver and numerical integration. A member of Hewlett-Packard Voyager series of programmable calculators, it was produced between 1982 and 1989. The calculator is able to handle complex numbers and matrix operations. Although out of production, its popularity has led to high prices on the used market. The HP-15C was a replacement for the HP-34C. The 15C used bulk CMOS technology for its processor, resulting in very low power consumption.

=== HP 15C Limited Edition ===
After showing a prototype labelled HP 15c+ at the HHC 2010, HP announced the HP 15C Limited Edition (NW250AA) on 1 September 2011. It is based on a flashable controller utilizing the same ARM7TDMI core already used in the 2008 revision of the 12C but in a different package, an Atmel AT91SAM7L128-AU running an emulator written by Cyrille de Brébisson to execute the old HP Nut code much faster than on the original hardware. The calculator was released alongside the HP 12c 30th Anniversary Edition. This model is powered by two CR2032 batteries, and can easily be differentiated from the original model by the "Limited Edition" script below the company logo as well as the black text on brushed metal back label, as opposed to the white text on black of the original. The power consumption of the processor is greater than that of the original HP-15C, as HP did not use the same technology in any of the future models.

=== HP 15C Collector’s Edition ===
In May 2023, a HP 15C Collector's Edition was announced and was released in July 2023 by the HP Development Company, L.P.'s licensees Moravia Consulting spol. s r.o. and Royal Consumer Information Products, Inc. The calculator is manufactured in the Philippines. It supports up to 672 steps for programs and up to 99 registers. The initial firmware incorporates fixes for the known bugs from previous models (as shown below) and others; it is emulated on the same CPU as the 2015 and 2022 variants of the HP-12C, the Microchip ATSAM4LC2CA (ARM Cortex-M4). The calculator is also powered by two CR2032 batteries.

The test menu (Off, g+↵ Enter+ON) officially offers three choices. A fourth choice (4) is undocumented and permits to enter two hidden modes: "15.2" (more memory, but with some limitations like 8×8 inversion matrices and three-digit step number display) and "16" (emulating a HP-16C).

Unlike the earlier editions, the Collectors Edition does not have the "Hewlett-Packard" text along the bottom left of the panel and is a slightly darker shade of brown than the original.

== Bugs and problems ==
HP-15C:

- CHS stack lift bug (and fix)
- The non-responsive reset procedure documented in the 15C manual had the side effect of rotating the X register by 22 bits which could then be used to perform synthetic programming.

HP-15C Limited Edition:

- One of the more significant bugs in the released firmware version (dated 2011-04-15 in the self-test) is that PSE only works once in a program and subsequently blanks the display until the program stops or is stopped. Downgrading the firmware resolves the PSE bug, however, other bugs will also be reintroduced.
- The original HP-15C self-test keystrokes do not work with the HP-15C LE and can corrupt memory contents. Although a new functional self-test procedure was added, the original manual did not document it.

HP-15C Collector's Edition:

- The bugs above and others have been fixed in the firmware, or in the case of the non-functional self-test procedure, instructions to switch to the new self-test are included in the accompanying documentation. There are a number of bugs and shortcomings in the undocumented "15.2" and "16" modes, most of which were fixed by a community member by October 2023.
- Pressing and holding a label key after GSB, or pressing and holding A through E in user mode, shows the target step on the original HP-15C but runs the step immediately on the HP-15C CE.

== Legacy ==
An official PC emulator for the 15C is available as freeware from Hewlett-Packard.

There are many calculators simulating software, imitating various HP calculators.

== Gallery ==
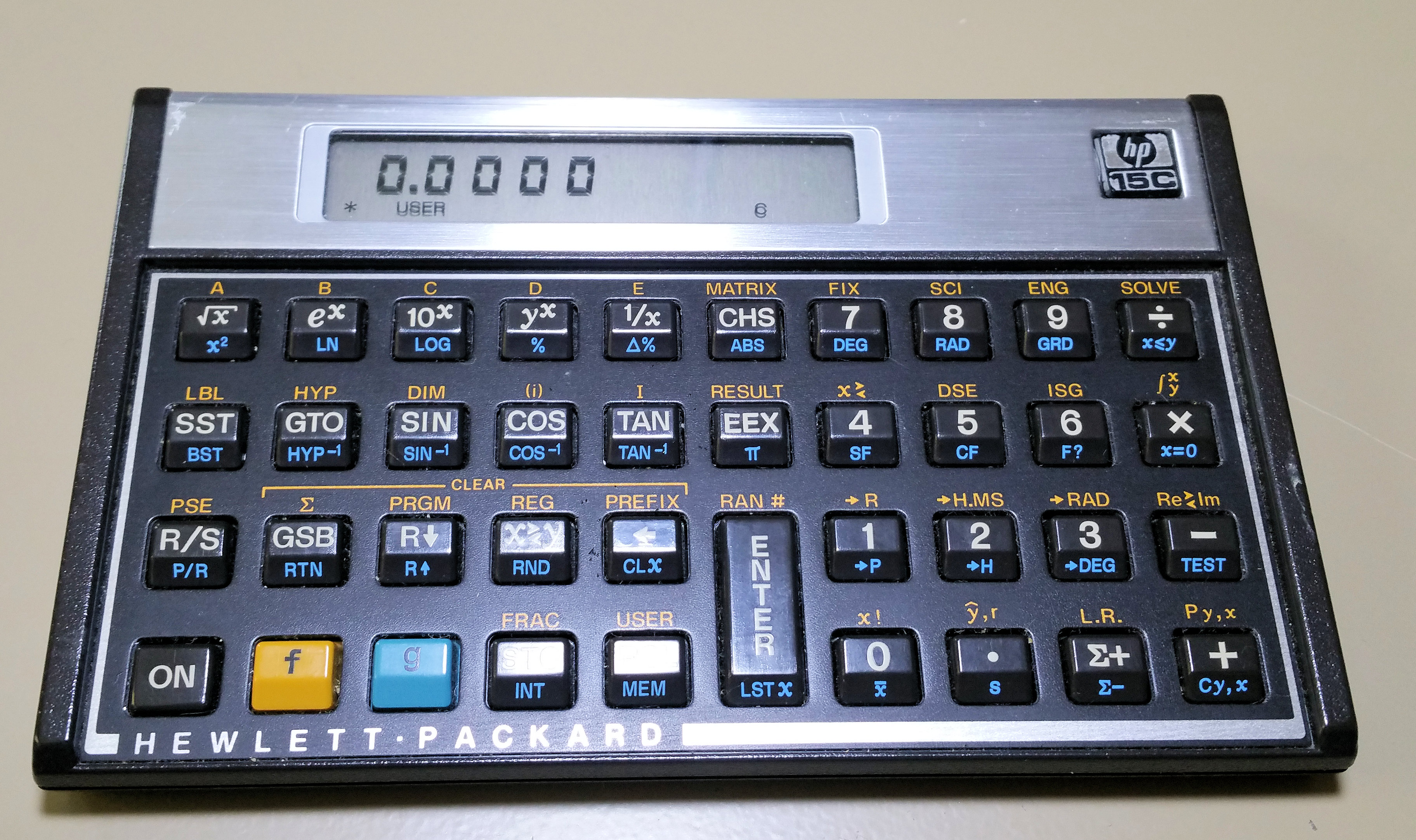
HP-15C from the 1980s

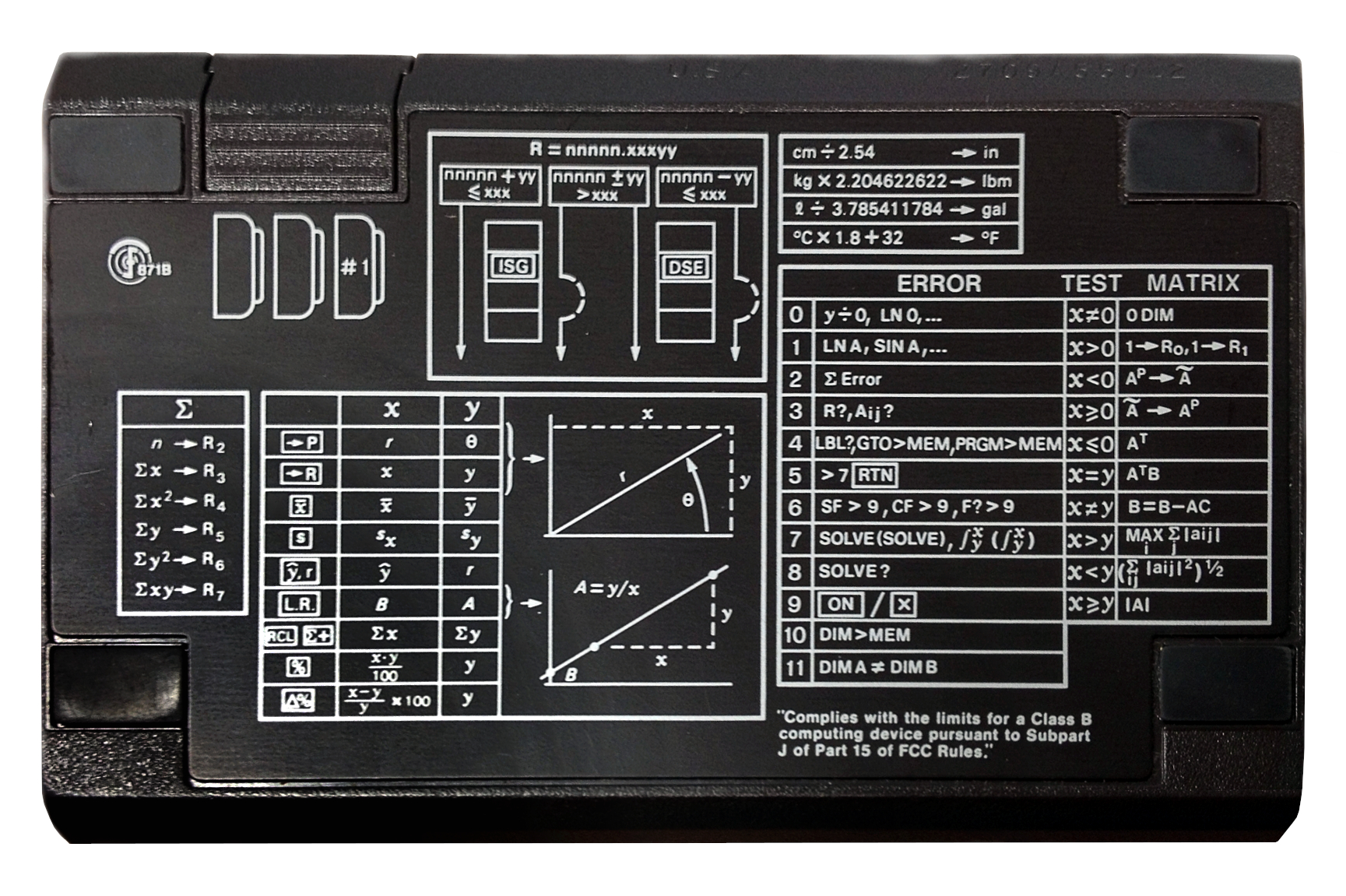
The rear side of HP-15C

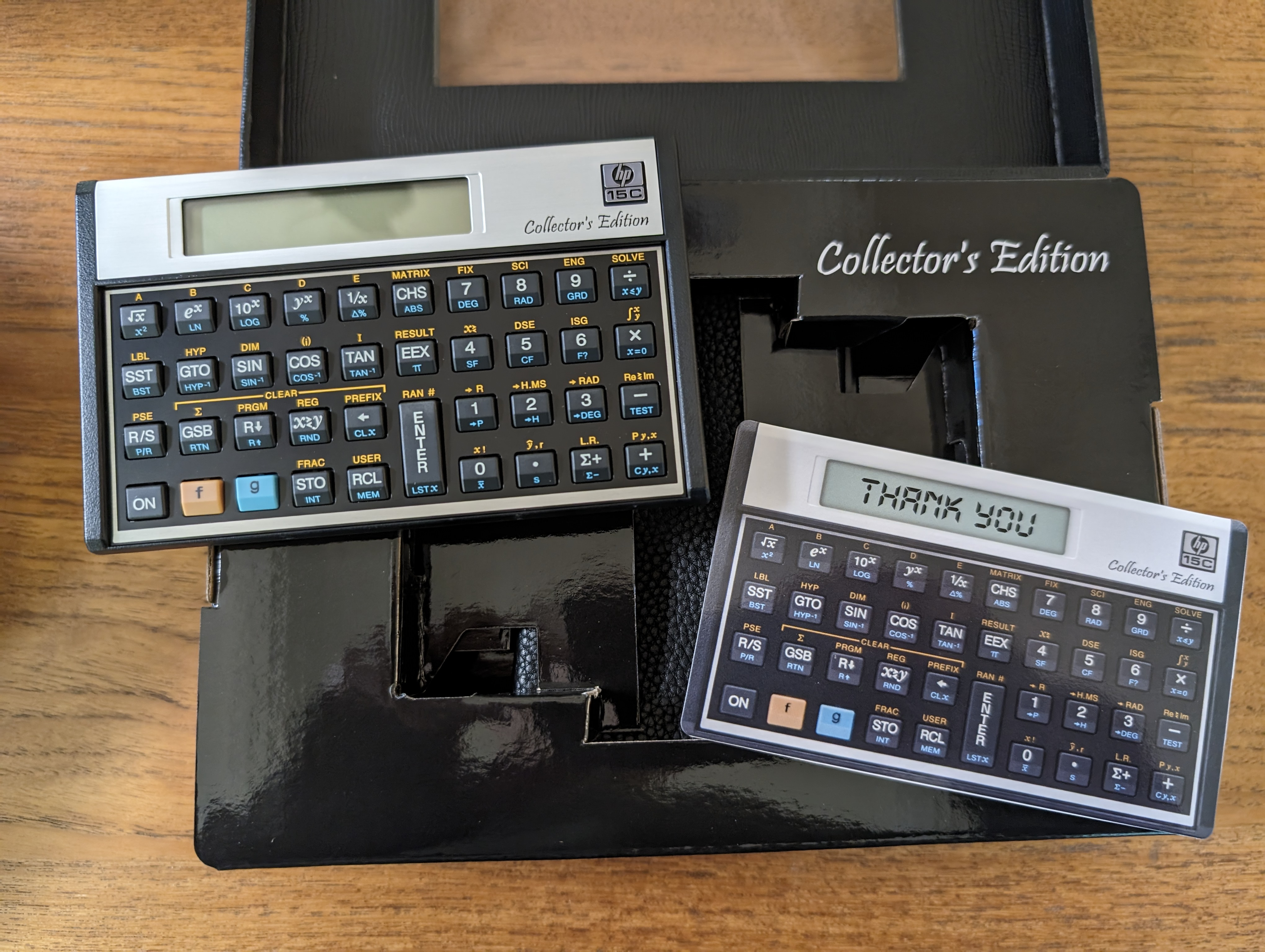
HP-15C Collector's Edition

== See also ==
- List of Hewlett-Packard products: Pocket calculators
- HP calculators
