= HP 30 series =

Series of pocket calculators by Hewlett-Packard

HP-30 series
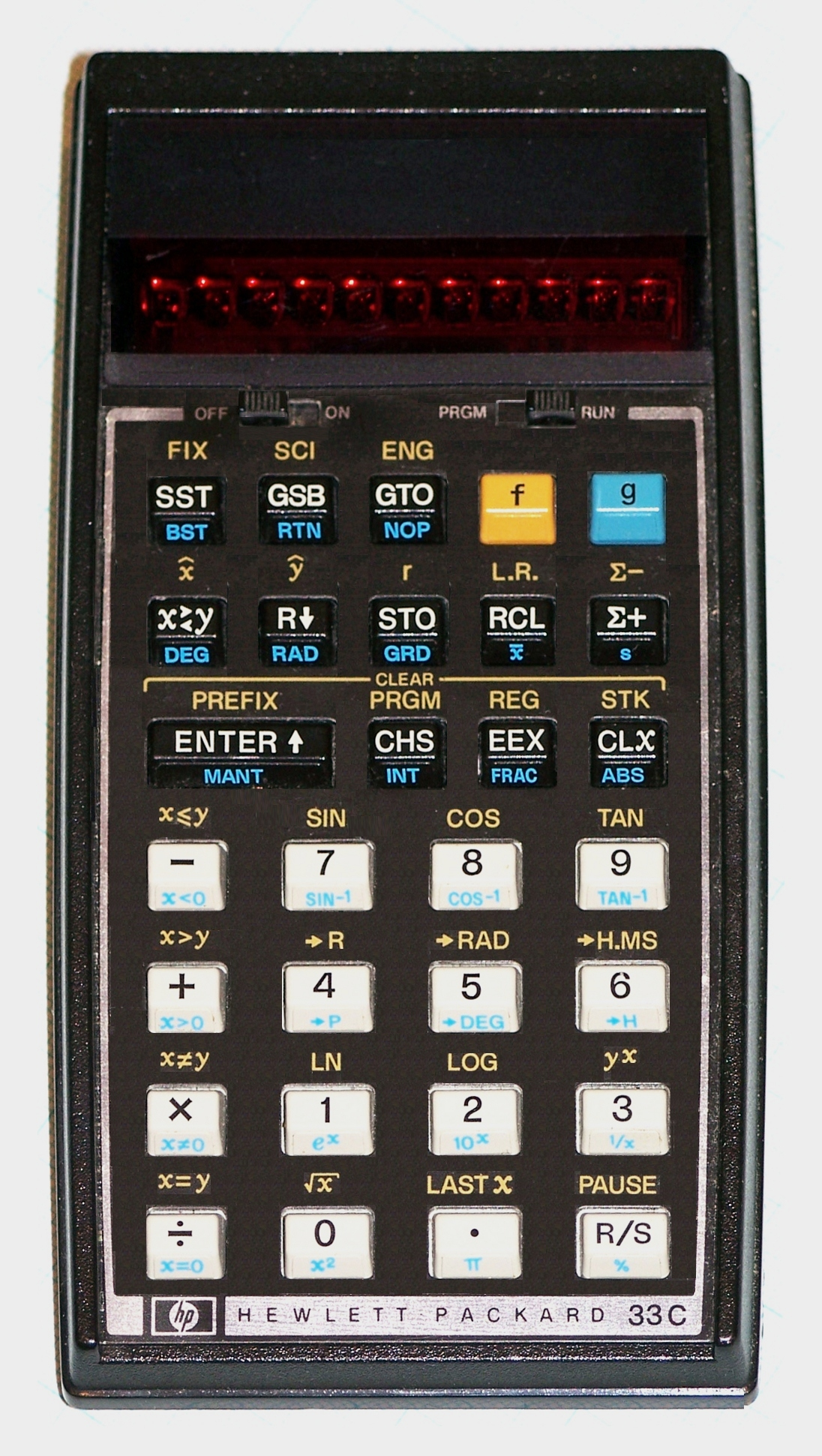
- The HP-33C
- Type: Programmable scientific
- Manufacturer: Hewlett-Packard
- Introduced: 1978
- Discontinued: 1983

Calculator
- Entry mode: RPN
- Precision: 10 display digits exponent ±99
- Display type: LED
- Display size: 1 line

CPU
- Processor: Saturn (Lewis)

Programming
- Programming language(s): RPN key stroke (fully merged)
- Firmware memory: ? KB of ROM

Interfaces
- Ports: no

Other
- Power supply: 2×1.5V AA cell batteries or power supply
- Weight: 6 oz (170 g) to 8 oz (230 g)
- Dimensions: 141×75×29mm

The HP-30 or Spice series are RPN scientific hand-held calculators introduced by Hewlett-Packard in 1978. Some models are programmable.

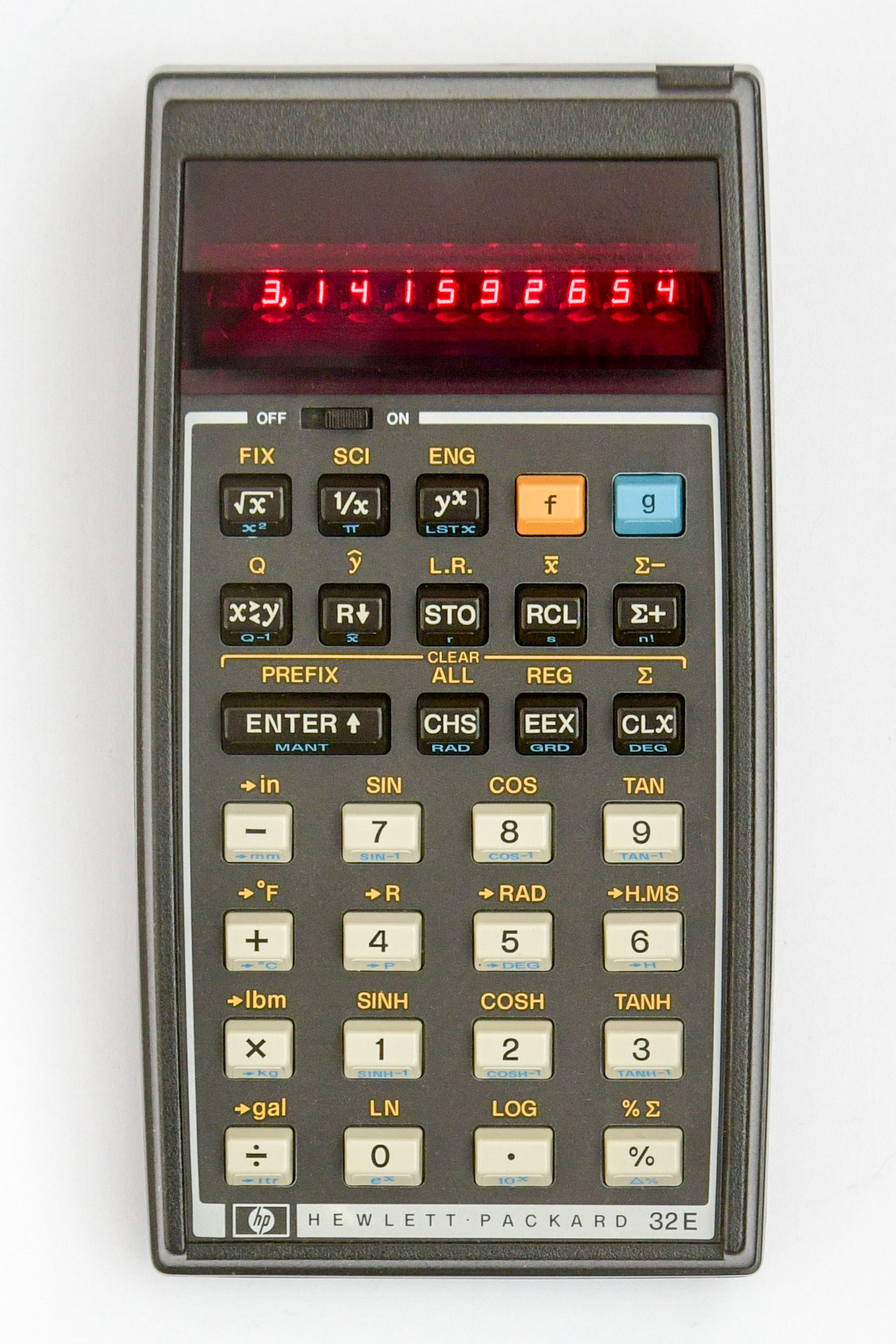
The HP-32E

== Overview ==
Perhaps the HP-30 series, Spice, was to be released as a replacement for the aging HP-20 series. It has no expandability. The display provided better readability by increasing the digit size and adding commas.

The entry-level models were the HP-31E and 32E, which were not programmable, but even the 31E provided a self-check function.

The HP-37E and 38E/C were the financial models of the Spice series.

The battery of these calculators can be changed without using tools. The housing is closed by screws.

=== Programming ===
The HP-33E/C (49 steps plus subroutines), HP-34C (70 steps) and 38E/C (99 steps) are programmable. The C-suffixed models have a continuous memory.

The production of the 31E ended in 1980, production of the other Spice models ended in 1983. This calculator is well regarded in terms of quality, key stroke feel and daily usability for engineers.

== Simulators and emulators ==
- HP Calculator emulators for Linux

== Features ==
- All basic scientific functions
- Statistics (HP-32E, HP-37E, HP-38E/C)
- Numerical integration (HP-34C)
- Programmability (keystroke programming with branching, loops, tests and flags)

== See also ==
- HP-34C
- HP calculators
- List of Hewlett-Packard pocket calculators
