= HP-10B =

Calculator

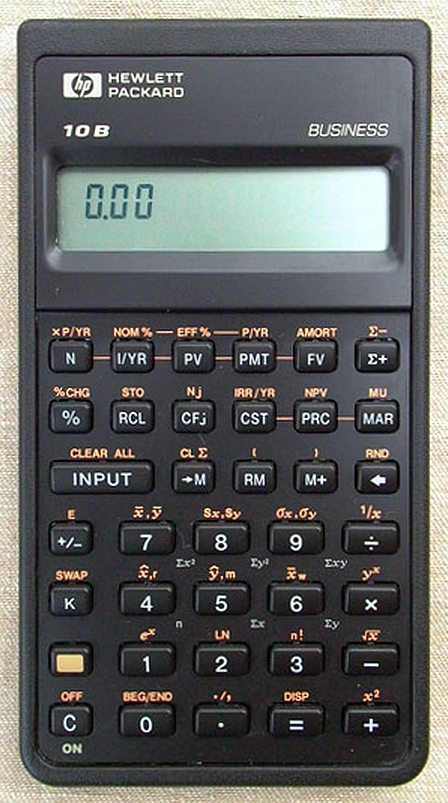
- HP 10B, first version
- Type: Financial calculator
- Manufacturer: Hewlett-Packard
- Introduced: 1989

Calculator
- Entry mode: Infix
- Precision: 12 display digits (15 digits internally), exponent ±499
- Display type: LCD seven-segment display
- Display size: 1 line

CPU
- Processor: Saturn Bert (HP-10B); Hitachi H8 (HP-10BII); Atmel AT91SAM7L128 or Atmel ATSAM4LC2CA (HP-10bII+)

Programming
- Firmware memory: 10 KB of ROM; Unknown (HP-10BII); 128 KB of Flash memory (HP-10bII+)

Other
- Power supply: 3×1.5V button cell batteries (Panasonic LR44, Duracell PX76A/675A or Energizer 357/303) (HP-10BII); 2xCR2032 coin cell batteries (HP-10BII and HP-10bII+)
- Weight: 4.2 oz (120 g)
- Dimensions: 148×80×15mm

The HP-10B (F1636A) is a student business calculator introduced in 1987. The model of this calculator proved to compete well with the higher end RPN HP-12C.

Two versions of the 10B were produced; both were based on the 1LU7 HP Saturn processor and have identical functionality. The first and most common has an orange shift key and matching orange lettering around the keys. This was replaced in 2000 with a model having teal green shifted operation labels to match the trade dress of other HP calculators of the time; because this model had a much shorter production run, extant copies are rarely found.

The successor HP 10BII (F1902A), which was introduced in 2001, has both cosmetic and architectural changes from its predecessor. It uses a different CPU based on the Hitachi H8 architecture. The calculator's firmware is not a perfect replica of the overall HP10B functionality. For instance, the keyboard layout is different, with two separate shift keys, and the available numbered-storage registers is reduced from 15 to 10. Early production runs were of poor quality; newer calculators have apparently solved this shortcoming.

The 10BII was released in two cosmetic variants. The first in 2001, branded as "10BII", had a golden bezel and mauve statistical shift button and key labels. The second in 2007, branded as "10bII", had a silver bezel and blue statistical shift button and key labels. As with the cosmetic variants of the original 10B, these two variants also appear to have identical functionality.

In 2011, the 10bII was replaced by the HP 10bII+ (NW239AA) model 1 (codenamed "Bluestar") with expanded capabilities. This model offers two modes of input logic, chain input which evaluates operators strictly in the order in which they are entered, and algebraic input which observes PEMDAS operator precedence. Chain input is backwards compatible with the previous models of the series. It added new financial functions such as bonds, break-even, and deprecation functions. Several additional scientific functions were also added, such as trigonometric and hyperbolic functions, their inverses, and several additional statistical regression models. The 10bII+ uses a flashable Atmel AT91SAM7L128 processor with ARM7TDMI core.

In 2015, the internal hardware of the HP 10bII+ changed to use an Atmel ATSAM4LC2CA processor with ARM Cortex-M4 core. The part number and physical appearance of model 2 didn't change except for a "Rev 2" plate on the bottom side. The serial numbers of the new model start with "PHA". The 2×3-pin flash port now uses the USB protocol instead of a TTL serial protocol.

None of the five models supports RPN.

== See also ==
- List of Hewlett-Packard products: Pocket calculators
- HP calculators
