= HP16 =

HP16 may refer to:

- AAA battery
- Calculator from the HP-10C series of calculators
- Great Missenden, postal code
