= SAMD =

SAMD or SaMD may refer to:

- SAM D, a family of ARM-based microcontroller products
- Software as a medical device (SaMD)
