= HP-18C =

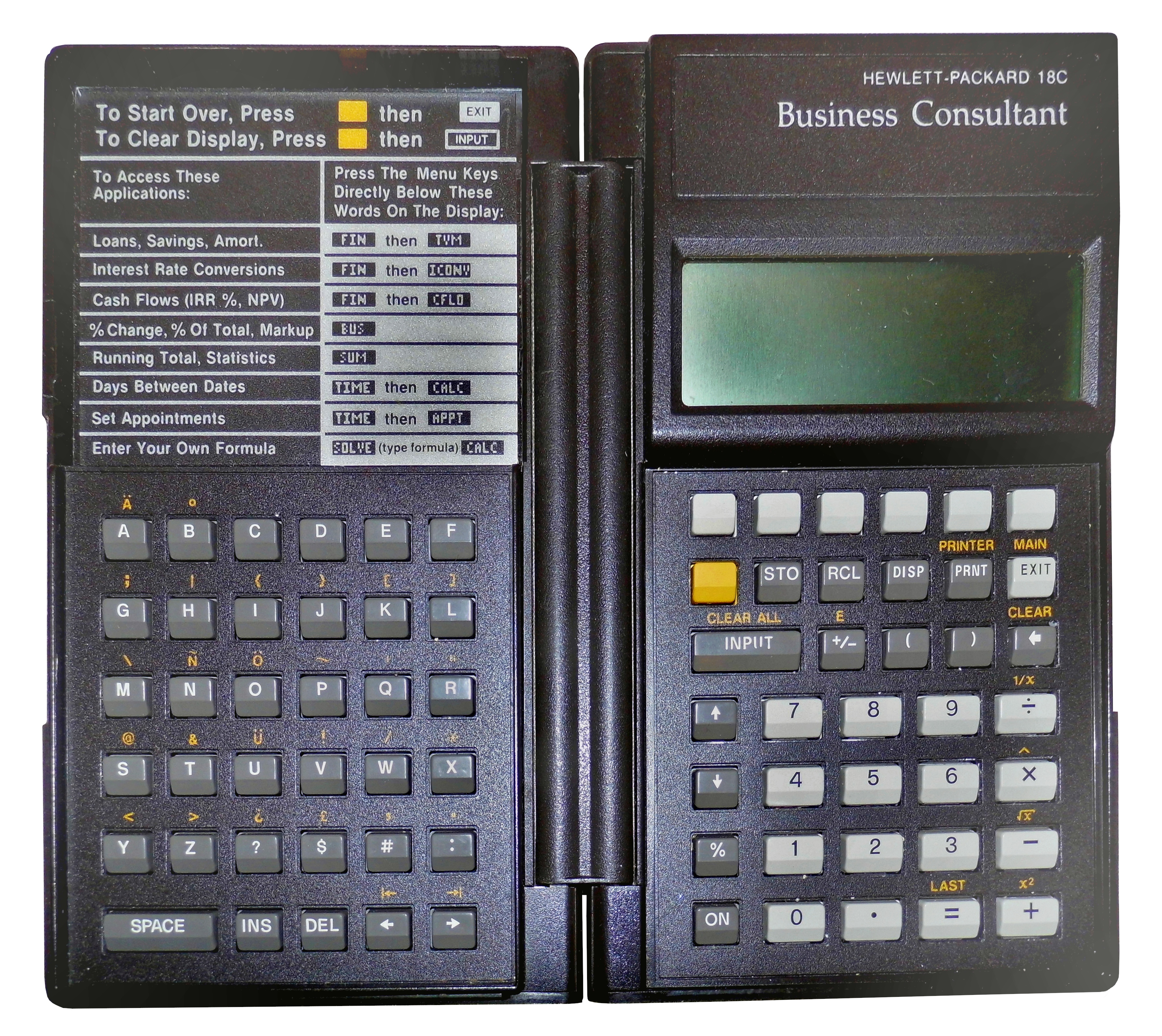
An HP-18C in the state used for operating it. When not in use or for transport, it can be folded together due to its clamshell design, so that its width becomes half of what it is in the image.

The HP-18C is a Hewlett-Packard business calculator which was quickly followed by the very similar but greatly improved HP-19B. The HP-18C is HP's first RPL-based calculator internally, even though this was not visible on user-level in this non user-programmable model. The user has a solver (another HP first) available, but only had about 1.5 KB of continuous memory available to store equations.

The calculator has many functions buried in a menu structure. The clamshell design is fairly robust, but the battery door is the shortcoming of this whole line; 18C, 19B, and 28C/S models.

The HP-18C was introduced in June 1986.

== See also ==
- HP calculators
- List of Hewlett-Packard products: Pocket calculators
