= HP calculators =

Calculator product line by Hewlett-Packard

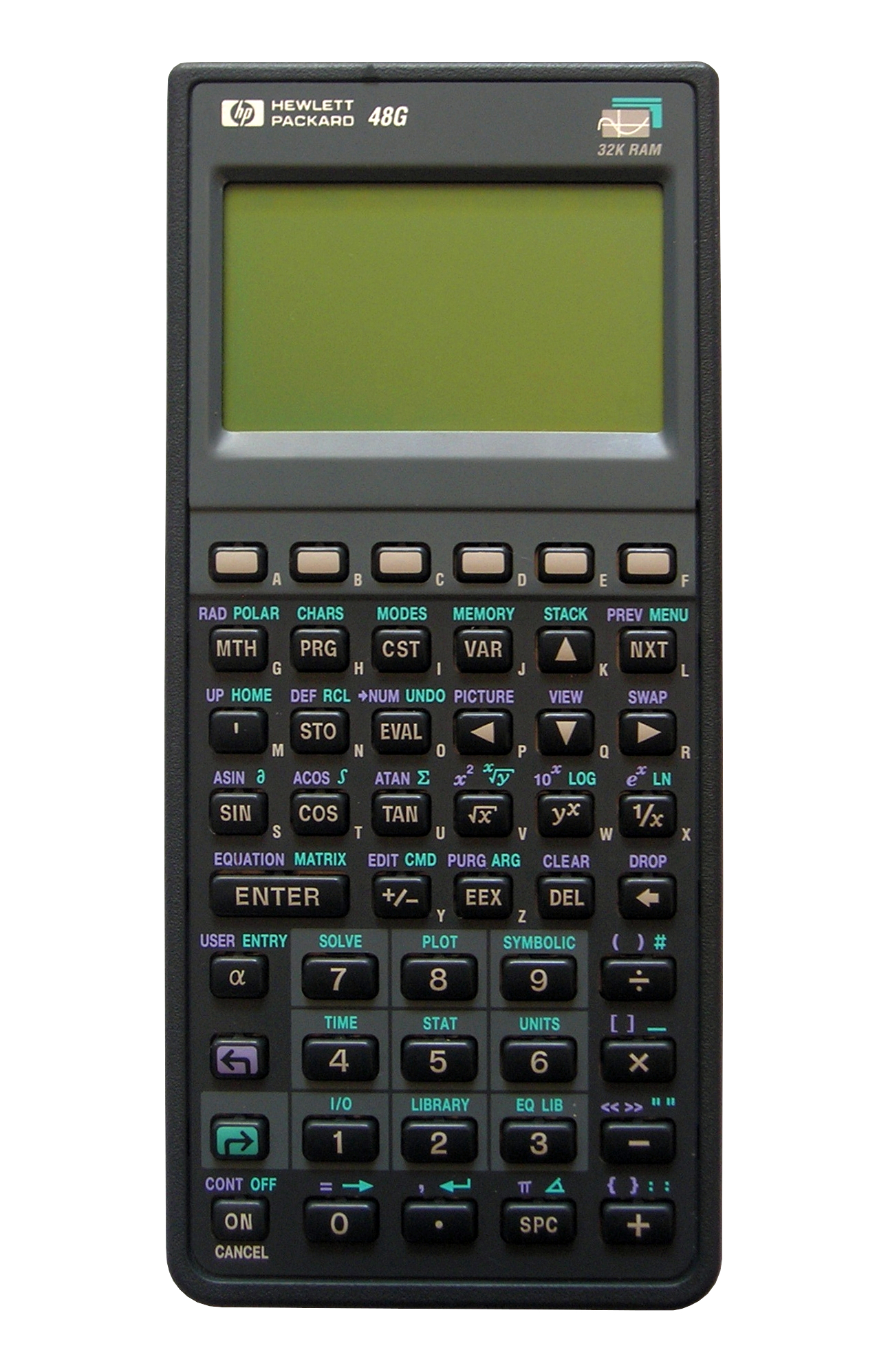
HP 48G

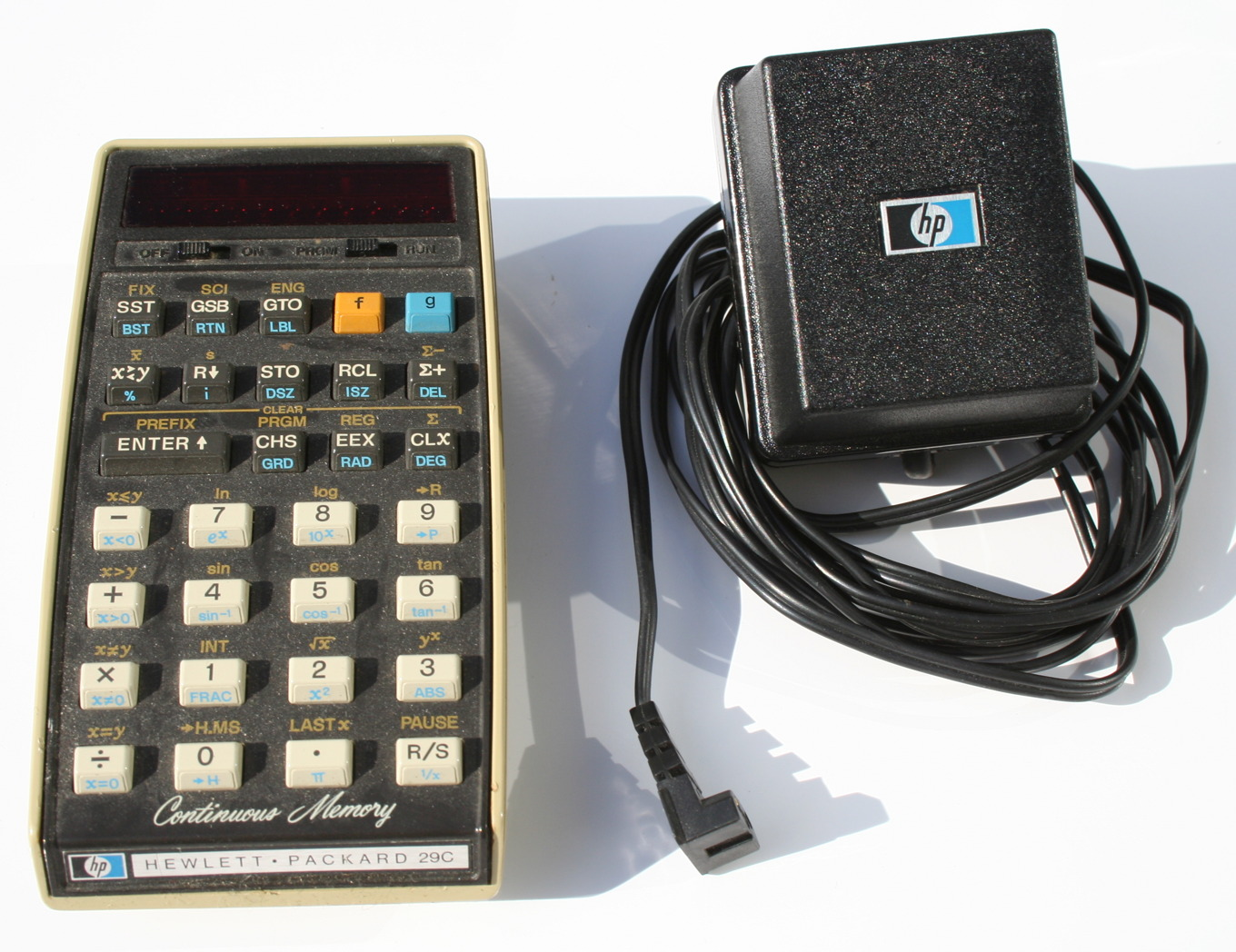
HP 29C

HP calculators are various calculators manufactured by the Hewlett-Packard company over the years.

Their desktop models included the HP 9800 series, while their handheld models started with the HP-35. Their focus has been on high-end scientific, engineering and complex financial uses.

== History ==
In the 1960s, Hewlett-Packard was becoming a diversified electronics company with product lines in electronic test equipment, scientific instrumentation, and medical electronics, and was just beginning its entry into computers. The corporation recognized two opportunities: it might be possible to automate the instrumentation that HP was producing, and HP's customer base were likely to buy a product that could replace the slide rules and adding machines that were being used for computation.

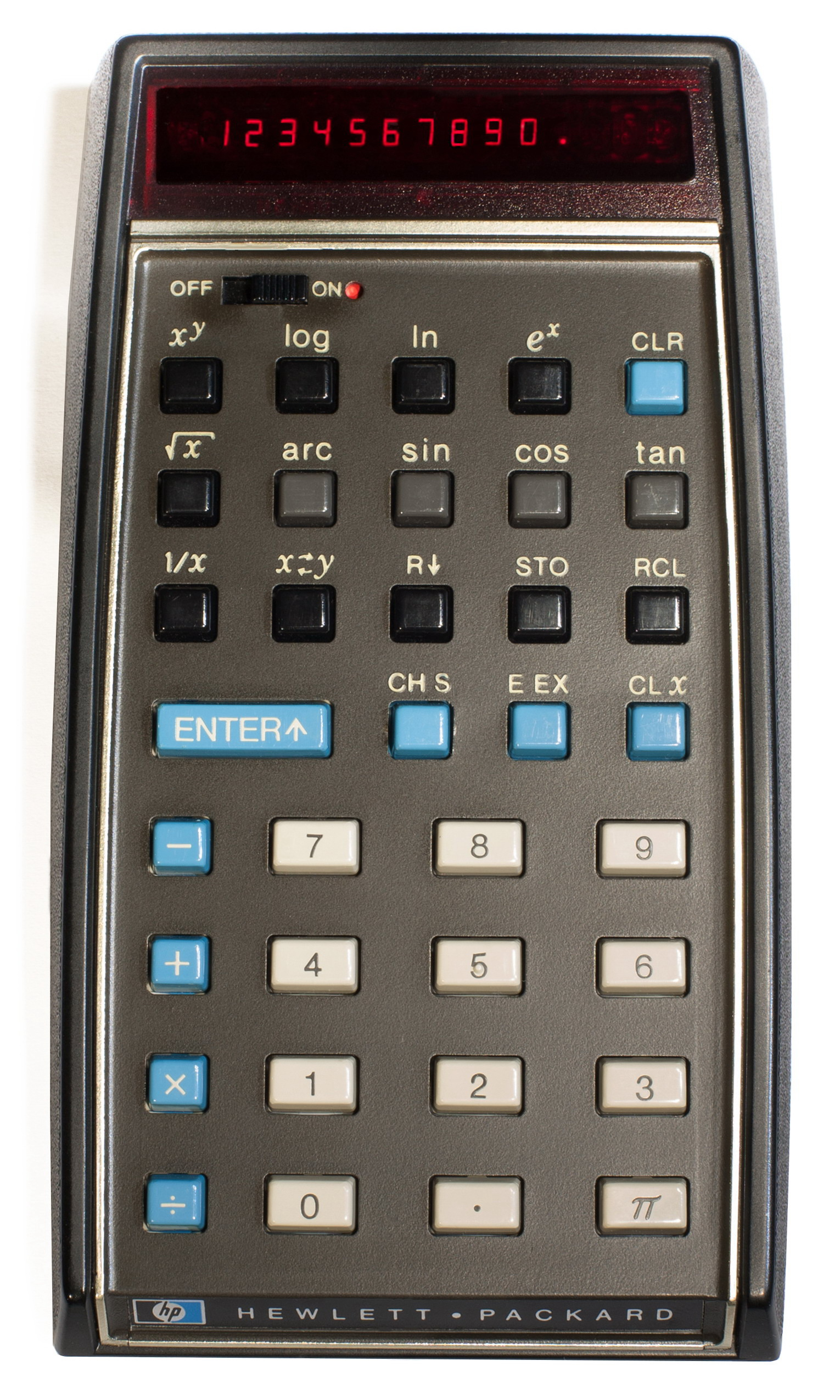
HP's first scientific calculator, HP-35

With this in mind, HP built the HP 9100 desktop scientific calculator. This was a full-featured calculator that included not only standard "adding machine" functions but also powerful capabilities to handle floating-point numbers, trigonometric functions, logarithms, exponentiation, and square roots.

This new calculator was well received by the customer base, but William Hewlett saw additional opportunities if the desktop calculator could be made small enough to fit into his shirt pocket. He charged his engineers with this exact goal using the size of his shirt pocket as a guide. The result was the HP-35 calculator. This calculator provided functionality that was revolutionary for a pocket calculator at that time.

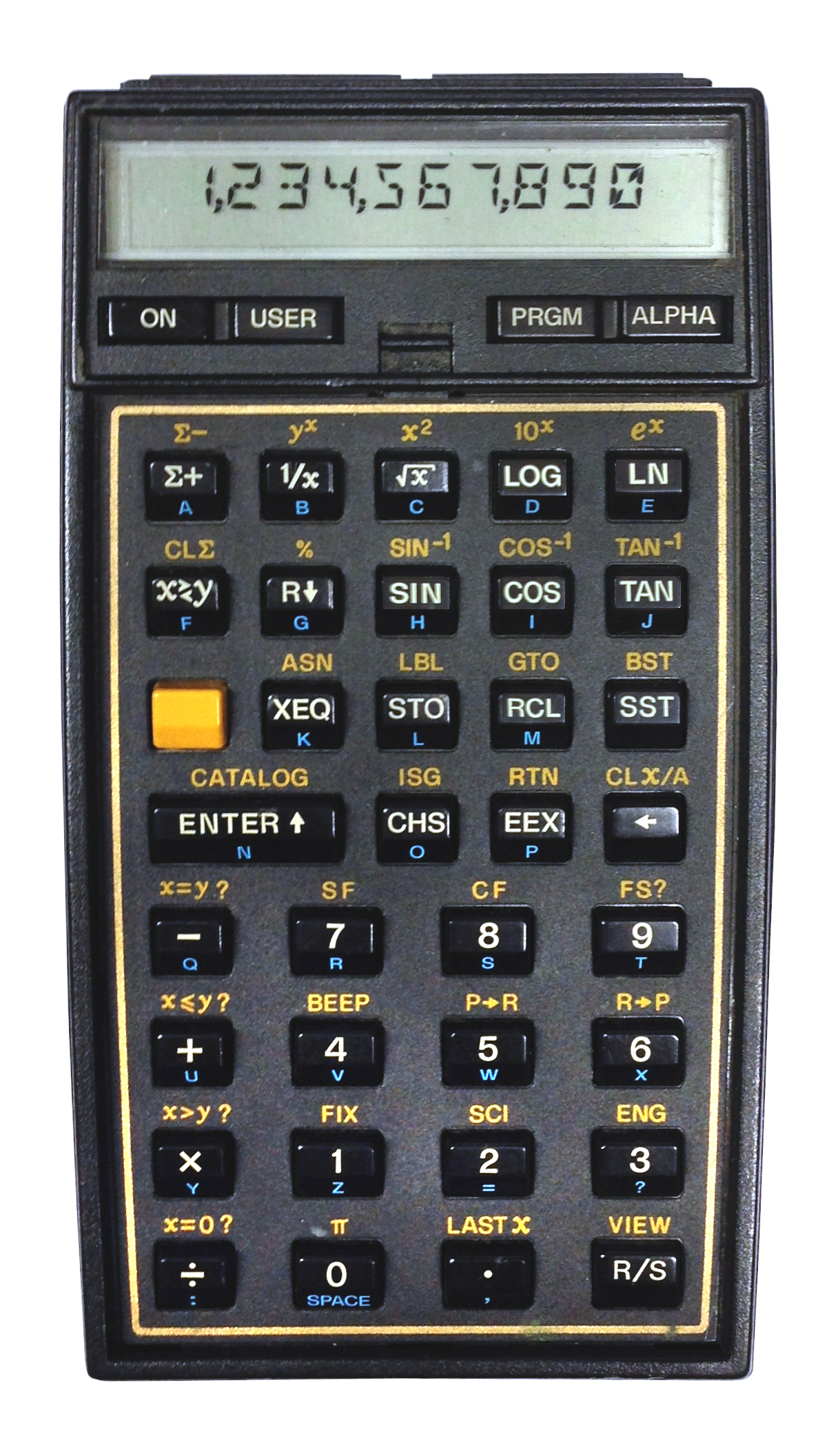
HP's first calculator with alpha-numeric display, HP-41C

Through the years, HP released several calculators that varied in their mathematical capabilities, programmability, and I/O capabilities. Some of them could be used (via HP-IL) to control the instruments other Hewlett Packard divisions produced.

On 1 November 2021, Moravia Consulting spol. s r.o. (for all markets but the Americas) and Royal Consumer Information Products, Inc. (for the Americas) became the licensees of HP Development Company, L.P. to continue the development, production, distribution, marketing and support of any HP-branded calculators.

== Characteristics ==
HP calculators are well known for their use of reverse Polish notation (RPN).

Programmable HP calculators allow users to create their own programs.

== Calculators ==
Below are some of HP's handheld calculator models produced over the years:

Product	Year	Description
HP 9g	2003	Graphing calculator designed by Kinpo Electronics, Inc.
HP 9s	2002	Scientific calculator designed by Kinpo Electronics, Inc., with the same form factor as the 9g and the 30S
HP-10	1977	Basic four-function calculator with printer and conventional arithmetic entry (no RPN).
HP-10B	1987	Financial calculator
HP-10C	1982	Range entry calculator, scientific programmable, statistical functions.
HP-10S+	2012	A dual-powered (battery and solar cells) algebraic scientific calculator with 2-line dot matrix and segment display.
HP-11C	1981	Scientific programmable, including hyperbolics, gamma function, statistical functions, and random number generation.
HP-10s	2007	A scientific calculator with more than 240 built-in functions, with 2 lines × 10 digits LCD.
HP-12C	1981	The finance-centric programmable calculator from the Voyager series introduced in the 1980s. The longest running product in the HP calculator line, it remains in production. Various models exist, the latest in 2008.
HP-14B	1988	Finance calculator with 12 digits precision and algebraic logic. It has 130 functions, 41 keys, and an LCD.
HP-15C	1982	Advanced scientific programmable, including hyperbolics, gamma function, combinatorial and statistical functions, random number generation, numerical integration, numerical root finding, plus comprehensive matrix operations and full support for complex numbers
HP-16C	1982	Computer science programmable calculator that could perform binary arithmetic, base-conversion (decimal, and binary, octal, and hexadecimal) and Boolean-logic functions.
HP-17B	1988	Financial calculator superseding the 12C, with two-line display, alphanumerics and sophisticated Solve functions rather than step programming. Uses the Saturn chip set.
HP-18C	1986	RPL clamshell business calculator.
HP-19B	1988	Financial calculator.
HP-19C	1977	Calculator with RPN and built-in thermal printer. Included a programming language with looping and branching.
HP 20b	2008	Financial calculator with RPN.
HP-20S	1988	A basic scientific calculator, using infix notation, barely programmable and with no graphing capabilities.
HP-21	1975	Scaled-down HP-25.
HP-21S	1989	An algebraic, keystroke programming calculator.
HP-22S	1988	An algebraic scientific/statistics calculator.
HP-25	1975	Smaller programmable model with programs up to 49 steps. Version HP-25C was first calculator with "continuous memory".
HP-27S	1988	The first HP pocket calculator to use algebraic notation only rather than RPN. It was a "do all" calculator that included algebraic solver like the HP-18C, statistical, probability and time/value of money calculations. It had approximately 7 kilobytes of programmable memory which could be used for formulas or notes. The two-push 6-key letter typing system was fairly fast after a learning period.
HP-28C	1987	RPN scientific graphing calculator. First HP graphing calculator, and introduced the Forth-like RPL, programmable keys, and symbolic equation solving, with 2 KB of user memory. Book-style design (flip-open cover) with keys on both interior halves.
HP-28S	1988	Expansion of HP-28C; 32 KB of user memory due to customers unexpectedly keeping programs in memory for extended periods. Introduced a file system for storing variables, functions, and user programs in the form of a multi-level tree. Like the HP-28C, this model used the "open-book" physical design. Functionally a direct predecessor to the HP-48 series, which returned to a more traditional physical design based on the HP-41.
HP-29C	1977	Programmable calculator with RPN. Included a programming language with looping and branching. An inexpensive variation on the 19C printer.
HP 30b	2010	Programmable Financial calculator released in 2010. Built in Black-Scholes Equation, FMRR and MIRR. Powered by ARM processor. Multiple input methods including RPN, chain algebraic, and normal.
HP 30s	2000	Calculator designed by Kinpo Electronics, Inc.
HP-32E	1978	Scientific non-programmable
HP-32S	1988	Scientific programmable, updated to HP-32SII
HP 33s	2003	Calculator designed by Kinpo Electronics, Inc. Successor to the HP-32SII.
HP-33C	1978	Scientific programmable. Successor to the HP-25 and HP-25C.
HP-34C	1979	Scientific programmable calculator. First with integration and root finding.
HP-35	1972	HP's first pocket calculator, and the world's first pocket calculator with transcendental functions. As such, it is regarded as the first "scientific" calculator.
HP 35s	2007	Introduced to commemorate the 35th anniversary of the HP-35, it is an advanced scientific programmable calculator, featuring algebraic and RPN modes, hyperbolics, statistics, numerical integration, numerical solver, random number generation, equations, and full programmability, using up to 32 Kb of RAM for programs and data.
HP 38G	1995	A simplified graphic model, using infix notation
HP 39G	2000	A successor to the HP-38, using infix notation
HP 39gs	2006	A successor to the HP 38G. It does not support RPN.
HP 39gII	2011	A successor to the HP 39gs. Nearly identical in features but with a high-resolution screen and internationalized for the Chinese market.
HP 40G series	2000	A successor to the HP 38G, using infix notation. The 40G is identical to the 39G but adds a computer algebra system.
HP-41 series	1979	Three models in this series were released over its lifetime, the 41C, 41CV, and 41CX. The 41C had user configurable program steps and memory registers, alpha-numeric display, user programmable key mappings, and four expansion ports that could hold additional memory, an interface to HP-IL peripherals, a magnetic card reader–writer, or commercial application programs. The 41CV quintupled the amount of base memory, and the 41CX added a clock and some additional functions and memory.
HP-42S	1988	A non-expandable follow-up to the HP-41 series. It included a two line display (dot addressable) and featured built-in matrix and complex number mathematics.
HP-45	1973	Improved version of the HP-35 with 10 memory registers, extra functions and display format selection.
HP 48 series	1990	Programmable graphic calculators, initially the SX and a year later the cheaper S, and three years later the G and GX with a faster processor and more graphical interface; SX and GX versions had expansion slots. Based on the functionality of the HP-28S, but with a return to a traditional appearance (similar to the HP-41 series). Historically one of the most popular models among engineers. Uses a filesystem first introduced on the HP-28S. Has a real-time clock and an operating system with programmable-action alarms, which could turn on the calculator and run arbitrary user programs at a user-specified time & frequency.
HP 49/50 series	1999	Enhanced, graphic versions of the HP 48 series. Later models designed by Kinpo Electronics, Inc.
HP 50g	2006	The latest member of the HP 49 series. Faster (ARM processor), larger display, and ability to read/write removable SD memory cards.
HP-55	1975	Lower cost version of the HP-65; no magnetic card reader, only 49 programming steps, but had 20 registers instead of just nine. Only model with an accurate (quartz crystal) stopwatch mode.
HP-65	1974	First programmable pocket calculator. Programs could be up to 100 steps in length and could be written to or read from magnetic strips.
HP-67	1976	Improved version of the HP-65.
HP-71B	1984	Handheld model natively programmable in an extended BASIC language including a RAM-based filesystem, recursion, multiline user-defined functions and subprogram calling with parameter passing, but also capable of accepting plug-in ROM modules to provide such functionalities as full I/O capabilities to any type of device (printers, mass storage, measurement instruments), programmability in other languages (Forth, Assembler), advanced math capabilities (such as matrix operations, support for complex numbers, multidimensional numerical integration and root finding, Fast Fourier Transforms, etc.), and an advanced Calculator Mode capable of executing algebraic expressions one step at a time and undoing individual steps.
HP-80	1973	HP's second handheld calculator, designed for business and including functions for Time Value Of Money, Sum of Digits depreciation and similar.
HP-97	1977	Desktop and printing version of the HP-67.
HP-300S+	2012	A dual-powered (battery and solar cells) algebraic scientific calculator with 4-lines LCD screen and can display expressions in textbook format.
HP Prime	2013	A "smartphone competitor" with a 3 1/2-inch color touch screen, "apps", CAS and exam feature that allows both selection of RPN vs. Algebraic vs. textbook and exam format for use on the SAT. Includes several new features such as color graphing animation and wireless (dongle) connectivity.
