= HP-16C =

Programmable calculator produce by Hewlett-Packard

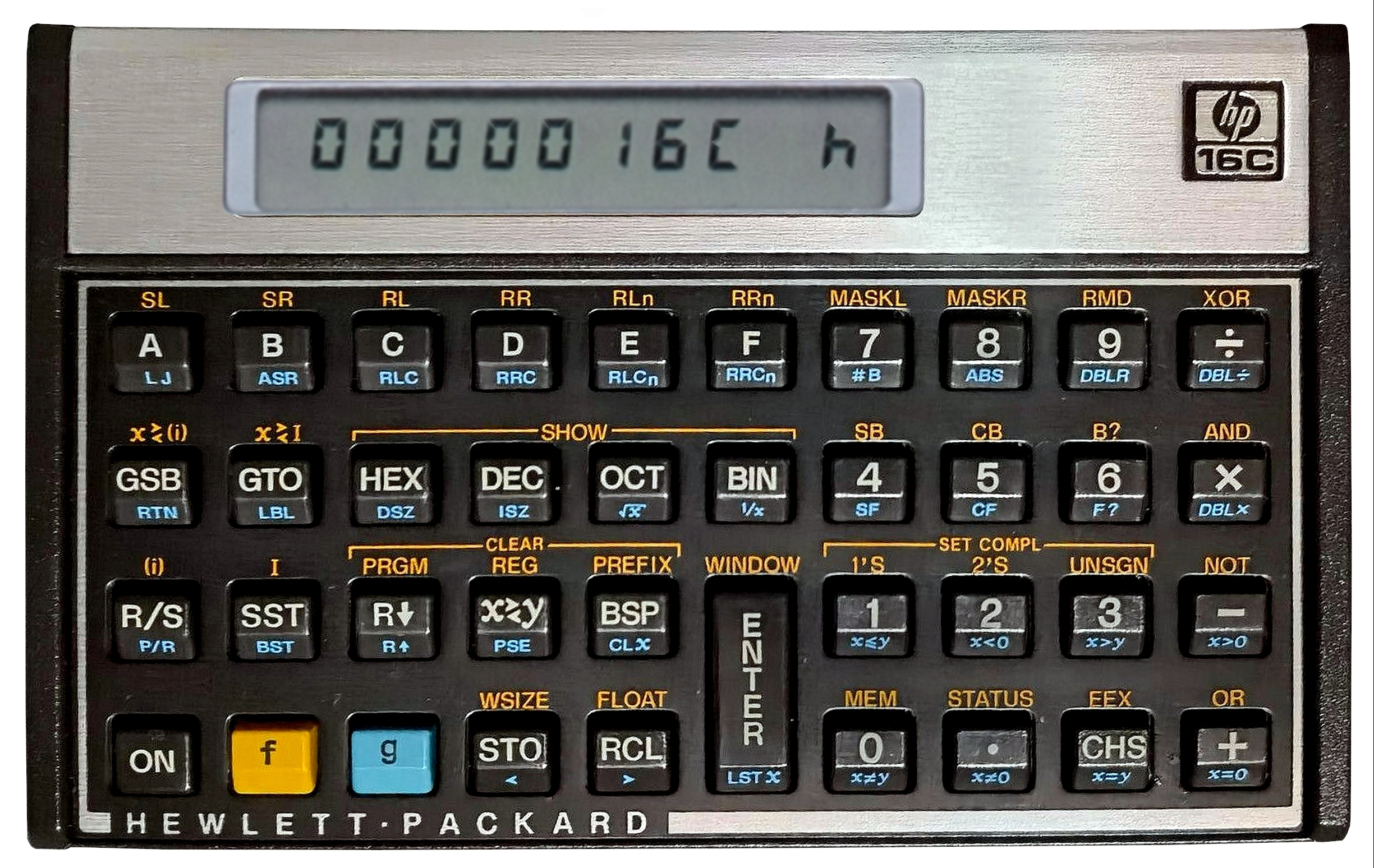
- HP-16C, showing its model name on the display as a hexadecimal number
- Type: Programmable, computer science
- Manufacturer: Hewlett-Packard
- Introduced: 1982
- Discontinued: 1989
- Cost: 150 USD (1982) – 120 USD (1989)

Calculator
- Entry mode: RPN
- Display type: LCD seven-segment display
- Display size: 10 digits

CPU
- Processor: HP Nut

Programming
- Programming language(s): Keystroke programming (fully merged)
- Memory register: 203 bytes (shared with programs)
- Program steps: up to 203 steps (shared with data registers)

Other
- Power supply: 3× LR44 1.5 V button cells
- Power consumption: 0.25 mW
- Weight: 113 g
- Dimensions: 128 × 79 × 15 mm

The HP-16C Computer Scientist is a programmable pocket calculator that was produced by Hewlett-Packard between 1982 and 1989. It was specifically designed for use by computer programmers, to assist in debugging. It is a member of the HP Voyager series of programmable calculators. It was the only programmer's calculator ever produced by HP, though many later HP calculators have incorporated most of the 16C's functions.

== Features ==
The 16C can display integers in hexadecimal, decimal, octal and binary, and convert numbers from one number base to another. It also deals with floating-point decimal numbers. To accommodate long integers, the display can be 'windowed' by shifting it left and right. For consistency with the computer the programmer is working with, the word size can be set to different values from 1 to 64 bits. Binary-arithmetic operations can be performed as unsigned, ones' complement, or two's complement operations. This allows the calculator to emulate the programmer's computer. A number of specialized functions are provided to assist the programmer, including left- and right-shifting, left- and right-rotating, masking, and bitwise logical operations.

Apart from programmer functions, the calculator's abilities are limited to basic arithmetic (and reciprocal and square root), which meant that typical users would also make use of a general scientific calculator. Floating-point numbers are only supported for base 10. However, it is still far more powerful (though also much more expensive) than contemporary competitors such as the non-programmable computer math calculator Casio CM-100 or the TI Programmer, LCD Programmer or Programmer II.

The back of the 16C features a printed reference chart for many of its functions.

The calculator uses the proprietary HP Nut processor produced in a bulk CMOS process and featured continuous memory, whereby the contents of memory are preserved while the calculator is turned off. Though commonplace now, this was still notable in the early 1980s, and is the origin of the "C" in the model name.

== Programming ==
The 16C, like all other members of the Voyager series, is itself programmable. Keystroke programming is used. Up to 203 program steps are available, and up to 16 program/step labels. Each step and label uses one byte, which consumes register space in 7 byte increments. Here is a sample program that computes the factorial of an integer number from 2 to 69. The program takes up 9 bytes. The codes displayed while entering the program generally correspond to the keypad row/column coordinates of the keys pressed.

Step	Keystrokes (shift keys not shown)	Displayed code	Comment
001	LBL F	43,22, F	Define label F (mnemonic for "factorial")
002	x<>I	42 22	Store x in register I
003	1	1	Store 1 in x
004	LBL 0	43,22, 0	Define label 0
005	RCL I	45 32	Recall register I into x
006	×	20	Multiply x and y
007	DSZ	43 23	Decrement register I and if not zero ...
008	GTO 0	22 0	... go back to label 0
009	RTN	43 21	Stop program - result displayed in x

To run the program, enter the argument onto the stack, then press the keystrokes GSB F. The result is displayed when the program terminates.

== Legacy ==
HP has never made another calculator specifically for programmers, but has incorporated many of the HP-16C's functions in later scientific and graphing calculators, for example the HP-42S (1988) and its successors.

Like many other vintage HP calculators, the HP-16C is now highly sought after by collectors.

In July 2023, the HP Development Company, L.P.'s licensees Moravia Consulting spol. s r.o. and Royal Consumer Information Products, Inc. introduced the HP-15C Collector's Edition, which comes with an undocumented mode to emulate the HP-16C as well. The original firmware still had a bug where numbers whose hexadecimal representation ends in E or F are displayed incorrectly in decimal mode, which was fixed by a community effort in October 2023.

In fall 2026 Moravia Consulting s.r.o. introduced HP-16 Collector's Edition, full scale licensed clone of HP-16C.

Several emulators, including official by HP, are available for desktop computers, web browsers, smartphones and other calculators.

There are many calculators simulating software, imitating various HP calculators. The WRPN Calculator, a public domain open-source HP-16C simulator, is one of the oldest yet active software project of the such type.

== See also ==
- List of Hewlett-Packard products § Pocket calculators
- HP calculators
