= HP 9g =

Hewlett-Packard graphing calculator

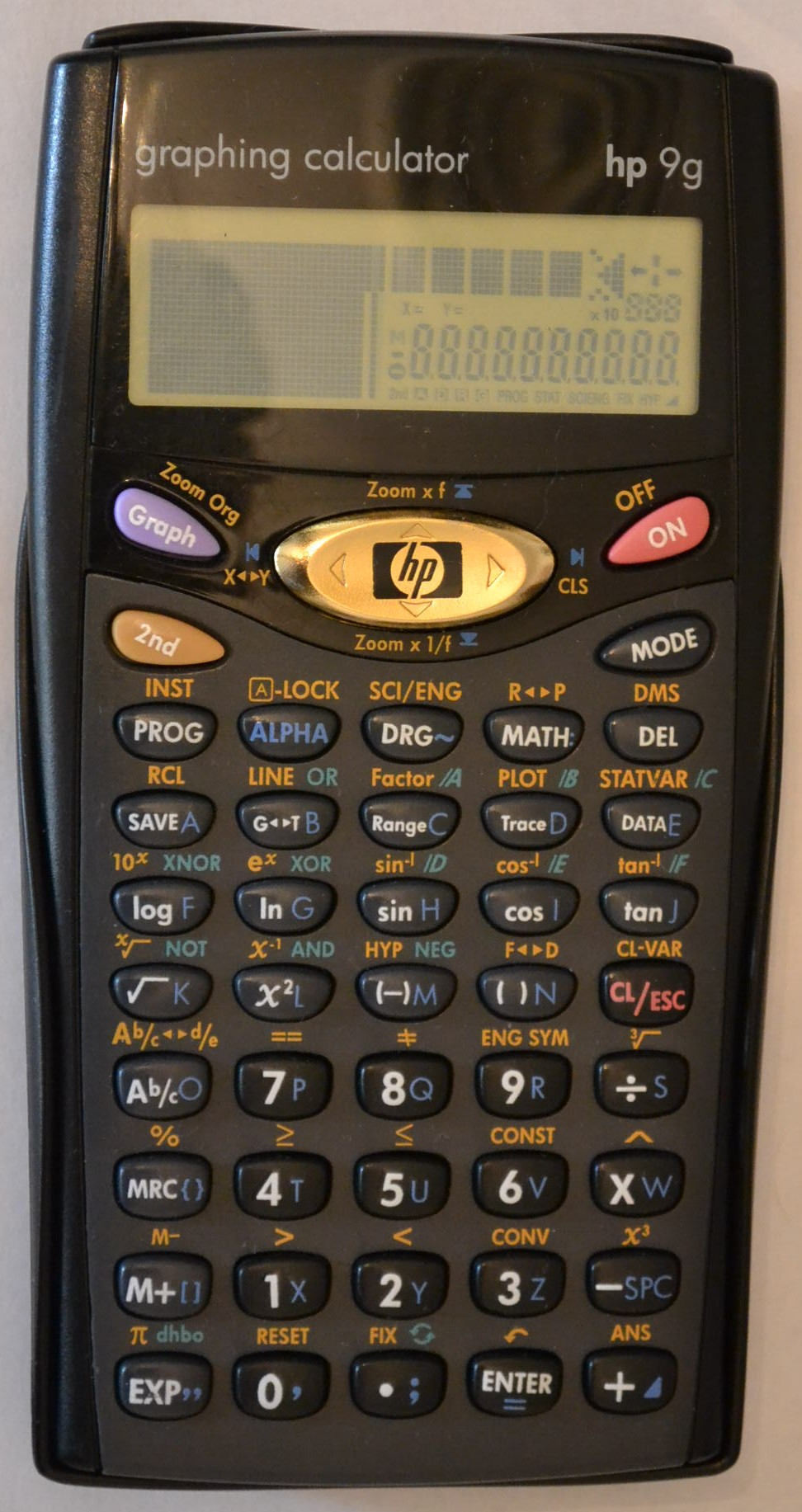
- Type: Scientific Graphing calculator Programmable
- Manufacturer: Hewlett-Packard
- Introduced: 2003
- Cost: $39–$45

Calculator
- Entry mode: Algebraic
- Precision: up to 24 digits
- Display type: Monochrome LCD
- Display size: 35×23 pixels + one line 5-digit 5×7 dot matrix + one line 10+3-digit 7-segment display

CPU
- Processor: Sunplus SPLB30A (aka Generalplus GPLB30A)

Programming
- Memory register: 400 bytes RAM

Other
- Power supply: 1× CR2025
- Power consumption: 6 mW
- Weight: 3.99 oz (124 g)
- Dimensions: 155 mm length × 81 mm width × 13.7 mm height

The HP 9g (F2222A) is a graphing calculator designed by Kinpo Electronics, Inc and produced by Hewlett-Packard. It has basic graphing, scientific and programming features designed for use by students.

Despite resembling a typical scientific calculator in appearance, such as those by competitors Casio and Sharp, the 9g departs from HP calculator tradition because it does not have an RPN mode. It is also particular unusual for its display, which includes a compact dot-matrix grid for displaying graphs, a dot-matrix character line which displays expressions being input (acting as a continuation of the dot-matrix grid), and a seven-segment line to display answers to expressions.

The HP 9g is similar to Citizen SRP-325G, also designed by Kinpo Electronics, Inc.

== See also ==
- Comparison of HP graphing calculators
- List of HP calculators
