= HP-34C =

Continuous memory calculator

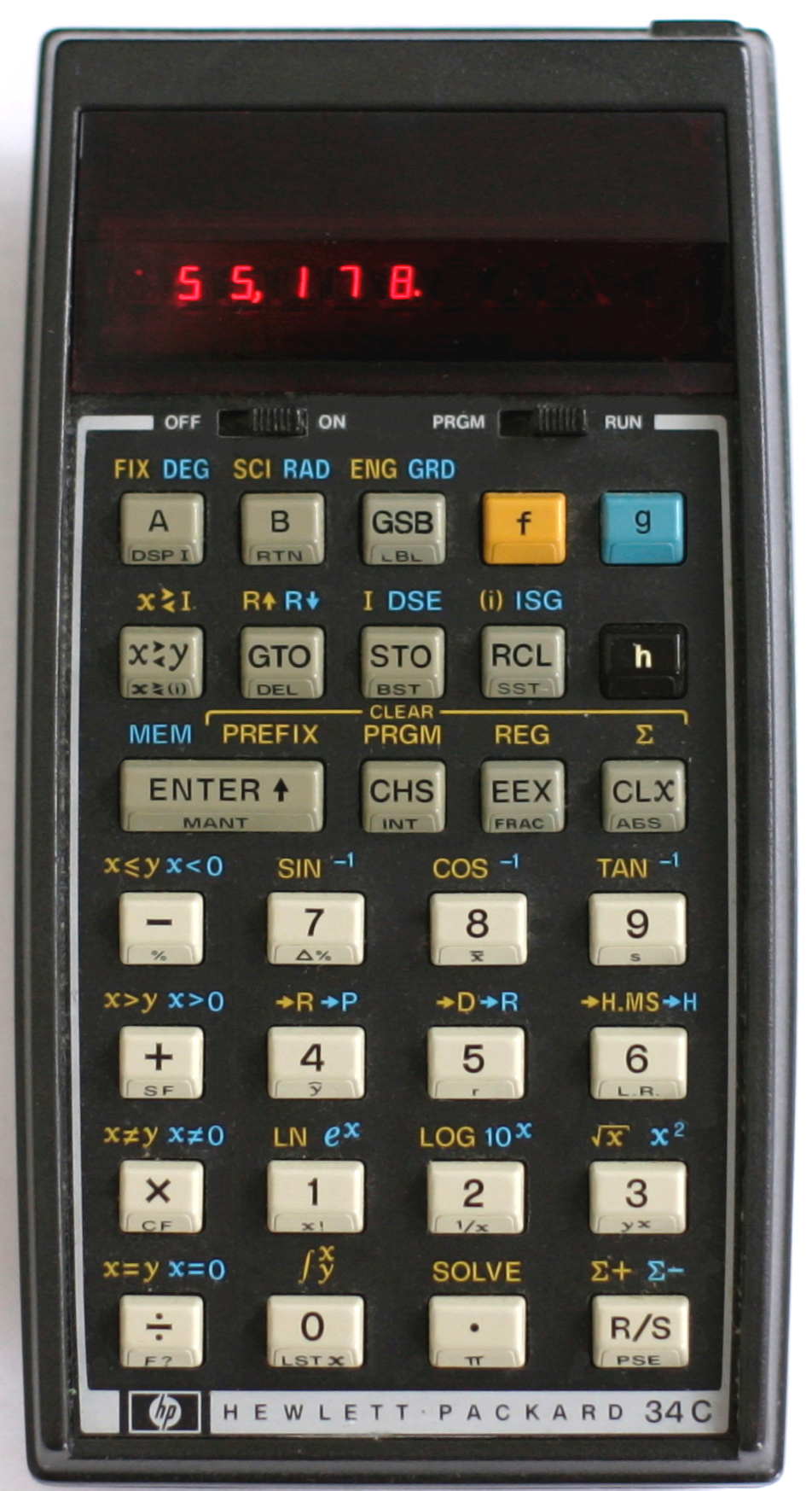
HP-34C Calculator

The HP-34C continuous memory calculator is an advanced scientific programmable calculator of the HP 30 series. It was produced between 1979 (cost US$150) and 1983 (cost US$100).

== Features ==
=== Root-finding and integration ===
Significant to the HP-34C calculator is the capability for integration and root-finding (a first for any pocket calculator). Integration and root-finding works by having the user input a formula as a program. Multiple roots are found using the technique of first finding a root $x=x_0$, then dividing the equation by $(x-x_0)$, thus driving the solution of the equation away from the root at that point. This technique for multiple root-finding is referred to as "deflation". The user would usually programmatically recall the root value from a storage register to improve its precision.

=== Programming ===
The common method of converting registers to program memory allowed the calculator a maximum of 210 program steps. Programming features such as indirect jumps provides substantial capability to the calculator's programmer.

The HP-34C shipped with an "applications" manual that included two games (Moon Rocket Lander and Nimb). The winner was announced via calculator spelling by turning the display upside down and the words BLISS or I'LOSE (55178 or 3507,1) were displayed. A game of blackjack was easily programmable by converting some of the registers to lines of program.

== Pedigree ==
The calculator was superseded, in 1982, by the HP-15C.

The HP-41C — introduced July 16, 1979, a few months before first deliveries of the HP-34C in October 1979 — was a separate product line from the HP-34C. They were differentiated as much by price (the HP-34C being 50% that of the HP-41C) as by functionality and performance. The HP-41C was the first HP LCD-based and module-expandable calculator, with alpha input, while the HP-34C was a fixed-purpose design with a red LED display. The price difference allowed those with economic constraints to still buy a high-end HP (HP-34C) scientific programmable within a reasonable cost. As such, they were sold side-by-side for a number of years.

== Design ==
The HP-34C came in a number of variants, such as plastic- and metal-keyboard versions and those with soldered (later 1983 variants) vs pressure-mounted circuitry (earlier variants 1979–1983).

== See also ==
- List of Hewlett-Packard products: Pocket calculators
- HP calculators
