= Hewlett-Packard Journal =

Hewlett-Packard Journal (ISSN 0018-1153) was a magazine published by Hewlett-Packard (HP) between 1949 and 1998. The first issue appeared in September 1949. Headquartered in Palo Alto, California, it covered technical and product news from HP. The magazine was started as monthly, but then its frequency switched to bimonthly. It is available as web-pages - or as scanned and available on the Wayback Machine's archive of HP Lab's site as PDF downloads.
