= HP Voyager =

Programmable calculator, 1982–1984

HP-10C
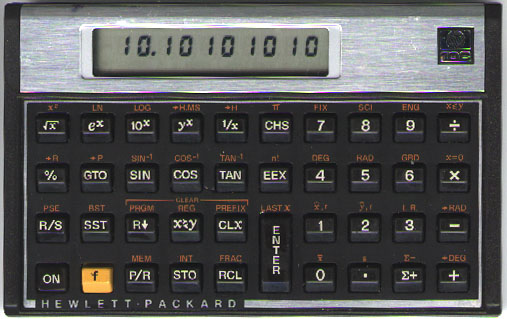
- HP-10C
- Type: Programmable scientific
- Manufacturer: Hewlett-Packard
- Introduced: 1982
- Discontinued: 1984
- Cost: $80 USD

Calculator
- Entry mode: RPN
- Display type: LCD seven-segment display
- Display size: 10 digits

CPU
- Processor: HP Nut core (1LF5)

Programming
- Programming language(s): Keystroke programmable (fully merged)
- Memory register: 0…9 registers (R0…R9) plus X, Y, Z, T, LAST X
- Program steps: 9…79 lines

Other
- Power consumption: 0.25 mW

HP-11C
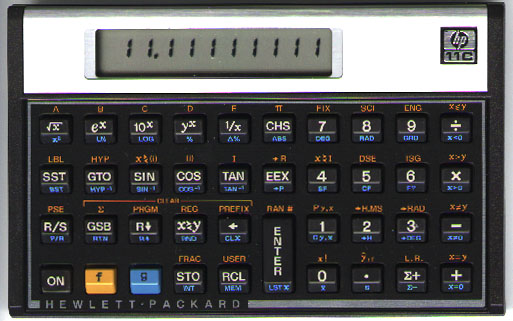
- HP-11C
- Type: Programmable scientific
- Manufacturer: Hewlett-Packard
- Introduced: 1981
- Discontinued: 1989
- Cost: $135 USD

Calculator
- Entry mode: RPN
- Display type: LCD seven-segment display
- Display size: 10 digits

CPU
- Processor: HP Nut core (1LF5 / 1LM2 / 1LQ9)

Programming
- Programming language(s): Keystroke programmable (fully merged)
- Memory register: 0…20 registers (R0…R9, R.0…R.9) plus RI, X, Y, Z, T, LAST X
- Program steps: 63…203 lines

Other
- Power consumption: 0.25 mW

HP-12C
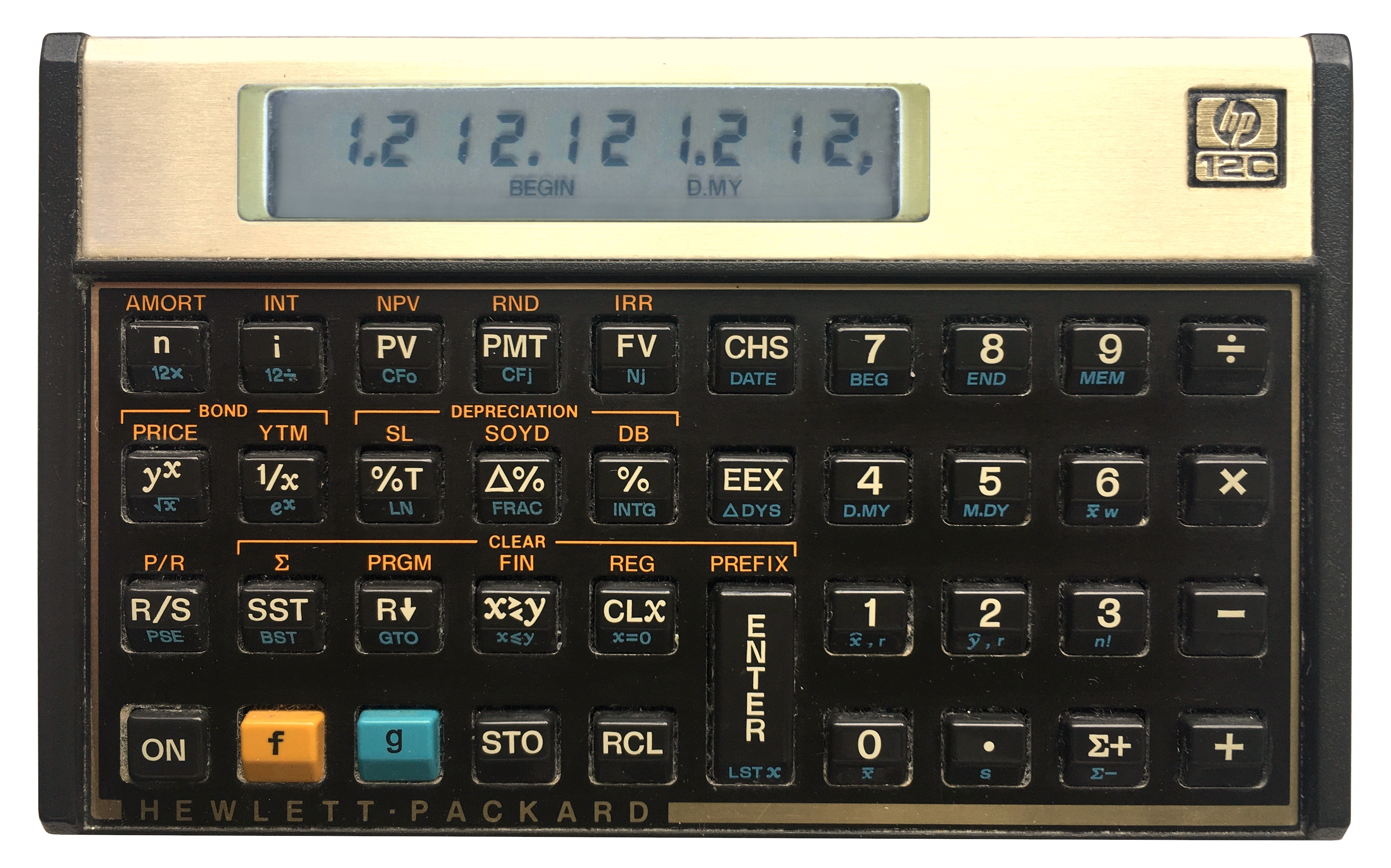
- HP-12C
- Type: Programmable Financial
- Manufacturer: Hewlett-Packard
- Introduced: 1981
- Cost: ca. USD 70,-

Calculator
- Entry mode: Classical RPN (4 stack level)
- Display type: LCD seven-segment display
- Display size: 10 digits

CPU
- Processor: Nut core (HP 1LF5 / HP 1LM2 / HP 1LQ9 / HP 1RR2 / Agilent/Marvell 2AF1) / ARM7TDMI core (Atmel AT91SAM7L128) / ARM Cortex-M4 core (Atmel ATSAM4LC2CA)

Programming
- Programming language(s): keystroke programmable (fully merged)
- Memory register: 7…20 (R0…R9/CF0…CF9, R.0…R.9/CF10…CF19) + 5 (n, i, PV, PMT, FV/CF20) + 5 (X, Y, Z, T, LAST X)
- Program steps: 8…99

Other
- Power supply: 4.5 V (3× LR44) or 3 V (1× or 2× CR2032) depending on model
- Power consumption: 0.25 mW
- Weight: 113 g
- Dimensions: 128 × 79 × 15 mm

HP-15C
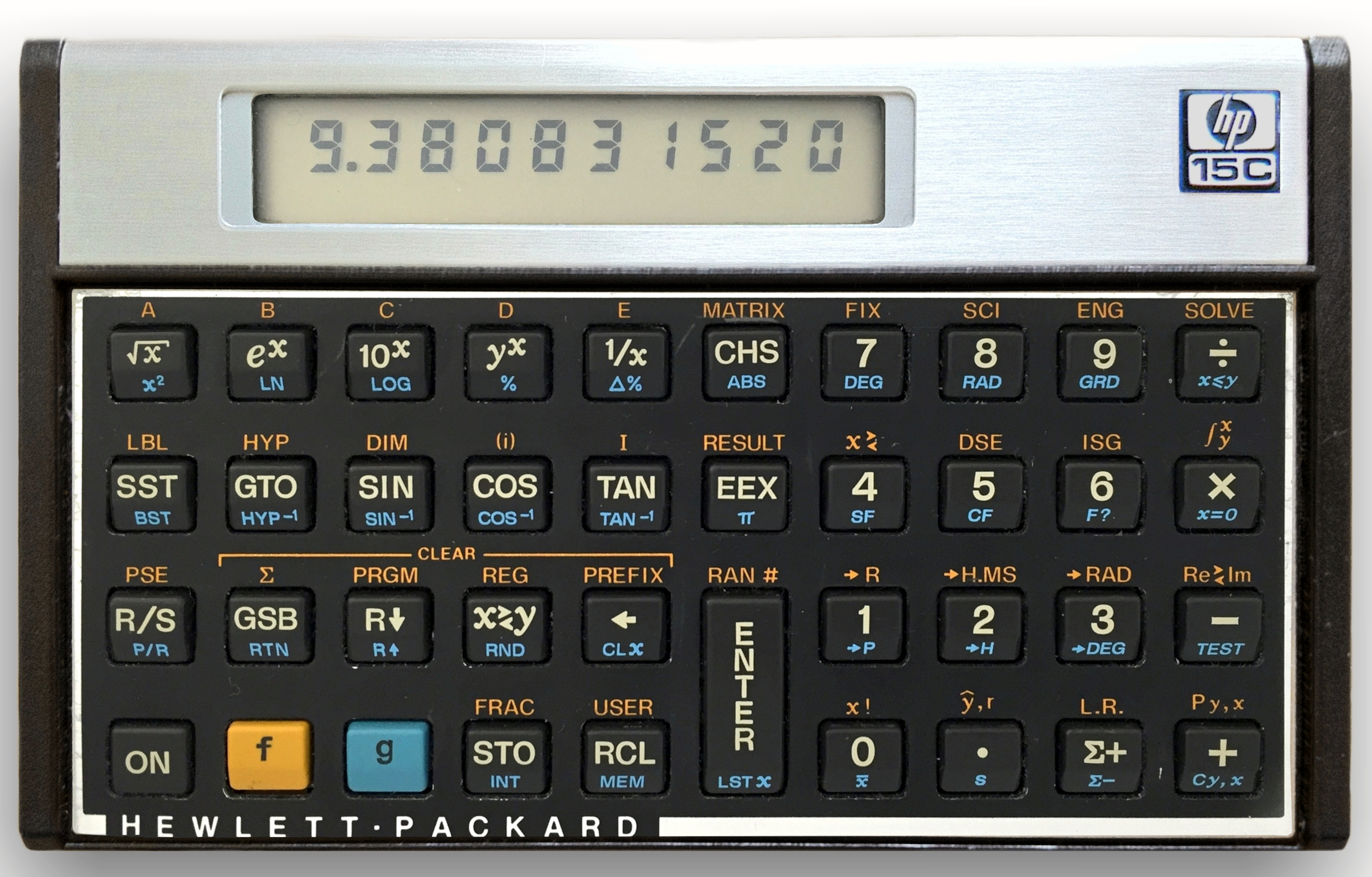
- HP-15C
- Type: Programmable scientific
- Manufacturer: Hewlett-Packard
- Introduced: 1982
- Discontinued: 1989
- Cost: USD 135 (Original) USD 99.99 – USD 179.99 (15C LE)

Calculator
- Entry mode: RPN
- Display type: LCD seven-segment display
- Display size: 10 digits

CPU
- Processor: HP Nut core (1LF5 / 1LM2 / 1LQ9) / ARM7TDMI core (Atmel AT91SAM7L128) (15C LE)

Programming
- Programming language(s): Keystroke programmable (fully merged)
- Memory register: 2…66 registers (R0…R9, R.0/R10…R.9/R20, R21…R65) plus RI, X, Y, Z, T, LAST X
- Program steps: 0…448 lines

Other
- Power consumption: 0.25 mW
- Weight: 113 g
- Dimensions: 128 × 79 × 15 mm

HP-16C
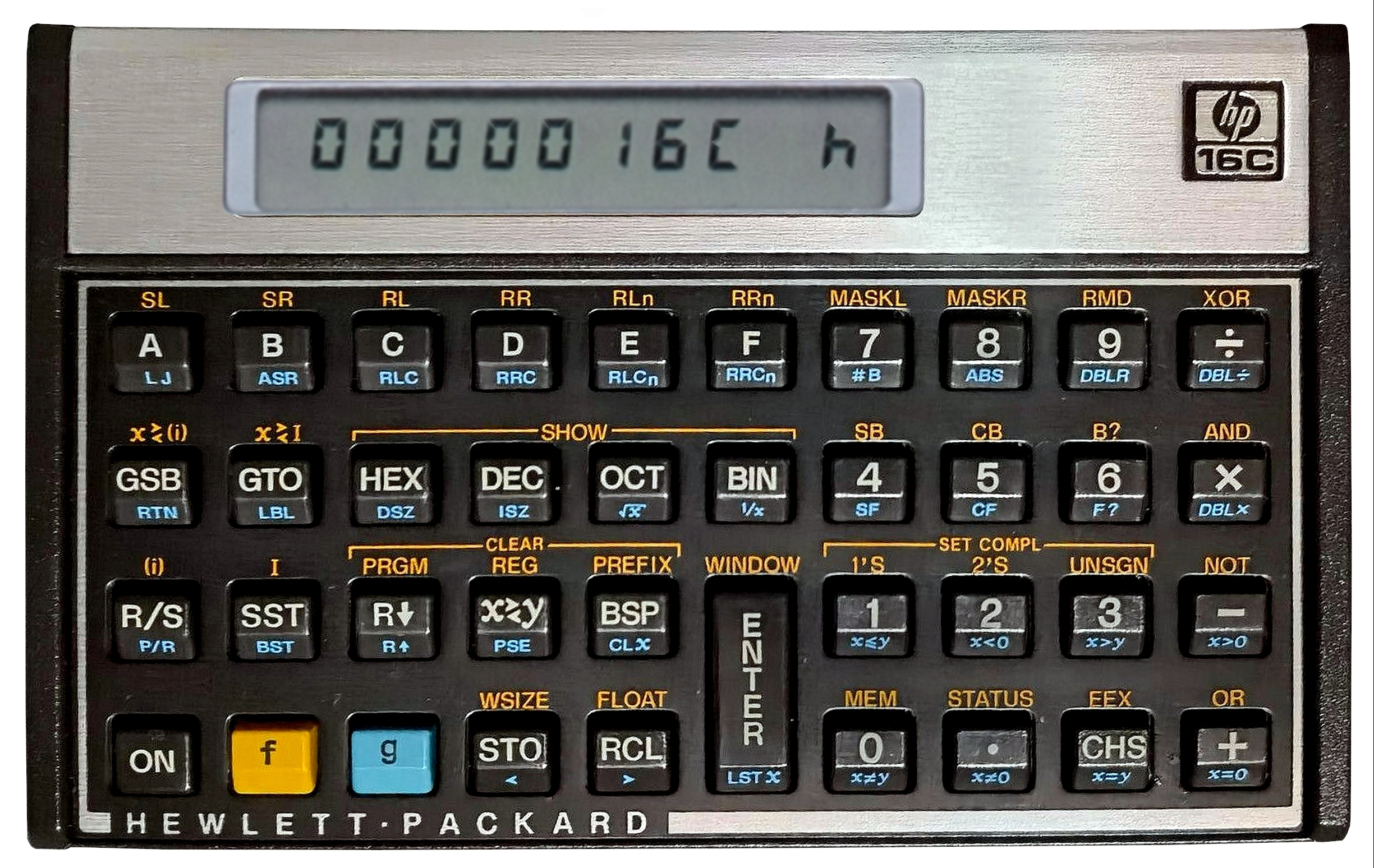
- HP-16C, showing its model name on the display as a hexadecimal number
- Type: Programmable, computer science
- Manufacturer: Hewlett-Packard
- Introduced: 1982
- Discontinued: 1989
- Cost: 150 USD (1982) – 120 USD (1989)

Calculator
- Entry mode: RPN
- Display type: LCD seven-segment display
- Display size: 10 digits

CPU
- Processor: HP Nut

Programming
- Programming language(s): Keystroke programming (fully merged)
- Memory register: 203 bytes (shared with programs)
- Program steps: up to 203 steps (shared with data registers)

Other
- Power supply: 3× LR44 1.5 V button cells
- Power consumption: 0.25 mW
- Weight: 113 g
- Dimensions: 128 × 79 × 15 mm

The Hewlett-Packard Voyager series of calculators were introduced by Hewlett-Packard in 1981. All members of this series are programmable, use Reverse Polish Notation, and feature continuous memory. Nearly identical in appearance, each model provided different capabilities and was aimed at different user markets.

== Models ==
The Voyager series of HP calculators included five models, some of which were manufactured in multiple variants (with years of production):

- HP-10C – basic scientific calculator (1982–1984)
- HP-11C – mid-range scientific calculator (1981–1989)
- HP-12C – business/financial calculator (1981–present)
- HP-15C – advanced scientific calculator (1982–1989, 2011, 2023–present)
- HP-16C – computer programmer's calculator (1982–1989)

=== HP-10C ===
The HP-10C is the last and lowest-featured calculator in this line to have been introduced, even though its number would suggest an earlier origin. The 10C was a basic scientific programmable calculator. While a useful general purpose RPN calculator, the HP-11C offered twice as much for only a slight increase in price. Designed to be an introductory calculator, it was still costly compared to the competition, and many looking at an HP would just step up to the better HP-11C. Poor sales led to a very short market life, making it one of the most difficult of the series to find today.

=== HP-11C ===
The HP-11C is a mid-range scientific programmable calculator.

=== HP-12C ===
The HP-12C is a popular financial calculator. It was such a successful model that Hewlett-Packard redesigned it from scratch, added several new functions, and reintroduced it as the HP 12c Platinum in 2003, along with the HP 12c Prestige. Over the years, a number of anniversary editions of the calculator were also produced.

The HP-12C is HP's longest and best-selling product, in continual production since its introduction in 1981.

=== HP-15C ===
The HP-15C is a high-end scientific programmable with a root-solver and numerical integration, produced between 1982 and 1989. It is also able to handle complex numbers and matrix operations. Although long discontinued, its continued popularity among users triggered Hewlett-Packard to offer a HP 15c Limited Edition remake of the calculator in 2011, followed by an HP 15C Collector's Edition in 2023.

=== HP-16C ===
The HP-16C is a computer programmer's calculator, designed to assist in debugging. It is able to display, compute, manipulate, and convert numbers in or between different numeric bases relevant for programming, including hexadecimal, decimal, octal, and binary. The display would use "h" to indicate hexadecimal, for example. A number of specialized functions are provided to assist the programmer, including left- and right-shifting, masking, and bitwise logical operations. HP has (as of 2015) never made another programmer's calculator, but the 16C's functions have been incorporated into later calculator models.

== Features ==
=== Arithmetic ===
Hewlett-Packard retained the numerical analyst William Kahan of UC Berkeley, the architect of the IEEE 754 standard for floating-point arithmetic, to design the numerical algorithms implemented by the calculators. He also wrote parts of the manuals.

=== Programming ===
The HP Voyager series calculator are keystroke programmable, meaning that it can remember and later execute sequences of keystrokes to solve particular problems of interest to the user. These keystroke programs, in addition to performing any operation normally available on the keyboard, can also make use of conditional and unconditional branching and looping instructions, allowing programs to perform repetitive operations and make decisions.

The available programming features differentiate between the various HP Voyager series calculator systems.

Function	HP-10C	HP-11C	HP-12C	HP-15C	HP-16C
BSP / ← (Note: Without BSP (backspace) programs can only be edited by overwriting existing steps.)	No	Yes	No	Yes	Yes
LBL (Note: Without LBL (Label) goto commands can reference only absolute program steps.)	No	Yes	No	Yes	Yes
GSB/RTN (Note: Without GSB (Go Subroutine) / RTN (Return from Subroutine) one cannot write subroutines.)	No	Yes	No	Yes	Yes
x≤y, x=0	Yes	Yes	Yes	Yes	Yes
x=y, x≠y	No	Yes	No	Yes (Note: Available via the g TEST n (indirect) function)	Yes
x<0, x≠0, x>y, x>0	No	Yes	No	Yes	Yes
x<y, x≤0, x≥y, x≥0	No	No	No	Yes	No
DSE, ISG (Note: Without DSZ/DSE (Decrement and Skip) and ISZ/ISG (Increment and Skip) writing loops is difficult.)	No	Yes	No	Yes	No
DSZ, ISZ	No	No	No	No (Note: It is available in HP-15C Collector's Edition after turning it into undocumented "16" (HP-16C) mode.)	Yes
SF, CF, F?	No	Yes	No	Yes	Yes
I (I) (Note: Without indirect addressing only the first 20 (0…19) register can be accessed. Also the programming model is not turing complete.)	No	Yes	No	Yes	Yes

== Legacy ==
=== Models ===
The HP-12C and its derivatives remain in widespread use today and is still available from Hewlett-Packard.

In 2011, the long-discontinued HP-15C was re-released as a "Limited Edition" that has since again been discontinued.

In 2023, the HP-15C was briefly released one more time as a Collector's Edition.

=== Emulators ===
Official emulators for the 12C and 15C are commercially available from Hewlett-Packard for Android and iOS devices.

=== Simulators ===
There are many software simulations of HP calculators, including Voyager-series devices. The WRPN Calculator, a public domain open-source HP-16C simulator, is one of the oldest active software projects of this type. Jovial Reverse Polish Notation Calculators is another project that has developed a cleanroom, open source implementation of the HP 15C and 16C calculators and has released a browser interface as well as installable applications for various platforms.

=== Clones ===
In 2011, the continued popularity of the Voyager series among users prompted SwissMicros (originally called RPN-Calc) to produce a series of credit-card-sized calculators looking like miniature versions of their HP equivalents and running the original HP firmware in an emulator on a modern calculator hardware. The series consisted of the DM10, DM11, DM12, DM15 and DM16. All calculators used the same hardware, but differ in keyboard and firmware (which can be changed with an upgrade port). After the introduction of the larger DM15L, DM41L and DM16L in 2015, the DM11L was added in January 2016 with the DM12L following in February. A limited production run for a DM10L was planned for 2019.

== See also ==
- Bulk CMOS semiconductor manufacturing process utilized for HP Nut processors

== Bibliography ==
- Hewlett-Packard HP-10C Owner's Handbook (PDF) (1 ed.). Corvallis, Oregon, USA: Hewlett-Packard Company, Corvallis Division. February 1982. HP part-number 00010-90025. Archived (PDF) from the original on 2015-10-05.
- Hewlett-Packard HP-11C Owner's Handbook and Problem-Solving Guide (PDF) (G ed.). Corvallis, Oregon, USA: Hewlett-Packard Company, Corvallis Division. November 1985. HP part-number 00011-90001. Archived (PDF) from the original on 2015-10-05.
