= HP 10s =

Hewlett-Packard scientific calculator

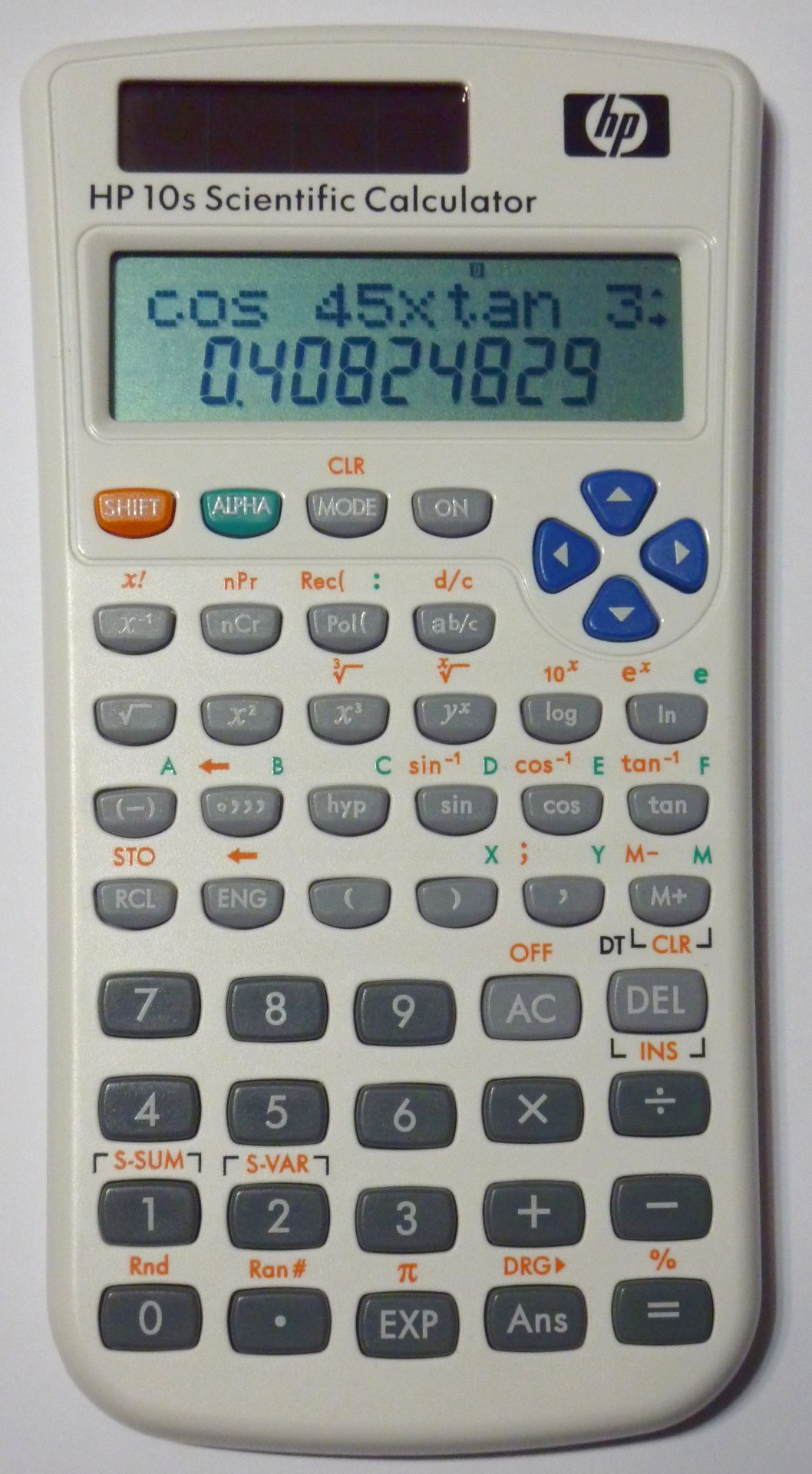
- HP 10s Scientific Calculator with slide-on protective cover
- Type: Scientific
- Manufacturer: Hewlett-Packard
- Introduced: 2007
- Cost: $9.99–$14.99

Calculator
- Entry mode: Algebraic
- Display type: LCD
- Display size: 61x18.8 px

CPU
- Processor: KI1724A

Programming
- Memory register: 128 KB RAM, 22 KB ROM

Other
- Power supply: Solar cell, 1 button-sized cell (LR44)
- Weight: 120 g (4.2 oz)
- Dimensions: 15.2 x 8.07 x 1.34.2 cm

Introduced by HP for students, the HP 10s (F2214A) is a scientific calculator with more than 240 built-in functions, with 2 lines x 10 digits LCD. It is permitted to use on SAT and ACT tests.

It has a standard scientific layout and function set that very closely correlates with the Casio fx-85MS, allowing for calculations to be done in a short time.

The 10s was replaced by the HP 10s+ (NW276AA).

In 2022, Moravia Consulting spol. s r.o. launched the HP 10sII for the Australian market.

== See also ==
- Scientific calculator
