= Continuous memory =

The term continuous memory was coined by Hewlett-Packard (HP) to describe a unique feature of certain HP calculators whereby the calculator could internally sustain most, or in later models - all, of the contents of user memory (via battery-backed CMOS memory). Since its introduction on the HP-25C, this feature slowly evolved by model to eventually mean maintaining the contents of nearly all calculator memory, including system and scratch RAM, options, settings, flags, and other calculator state information.

Before the introduction of the HP-25C in 1976, all calculator random-access memory (RAM) was volatile, i.e. its contents (esp. user data in storage registers and any user programs) were cleared when the calculator was turned off. Three early models with this improved, continuous memory - the HP-25C, HP-29C, and HP-19C - actually had the words " Continuous Memory " printed in conspicuous, white script on the bottom margin of their faceplates. The "C" in the model designations was to distinguish those models within HP's calculator product line. HP did not print this phrase on subsequent, featured models because the novelty of continuous memory had by then faded and also because it could no longer claim it as a feature unique to HP calculators (Texas Instruments would later call their identical feature "Constant Memory"). At introduction over the next 9 years (approx. 1979–1987), subsequent HP models so featured simply had designations in which the letter "C" followed the model number, e.g. the HP-34C and the Voyager series HP-10C, HP-11C, HP-12C, HP-15C and HP-16C.
