= TI-55 =

Programmable calculator produced by Texas Instruments

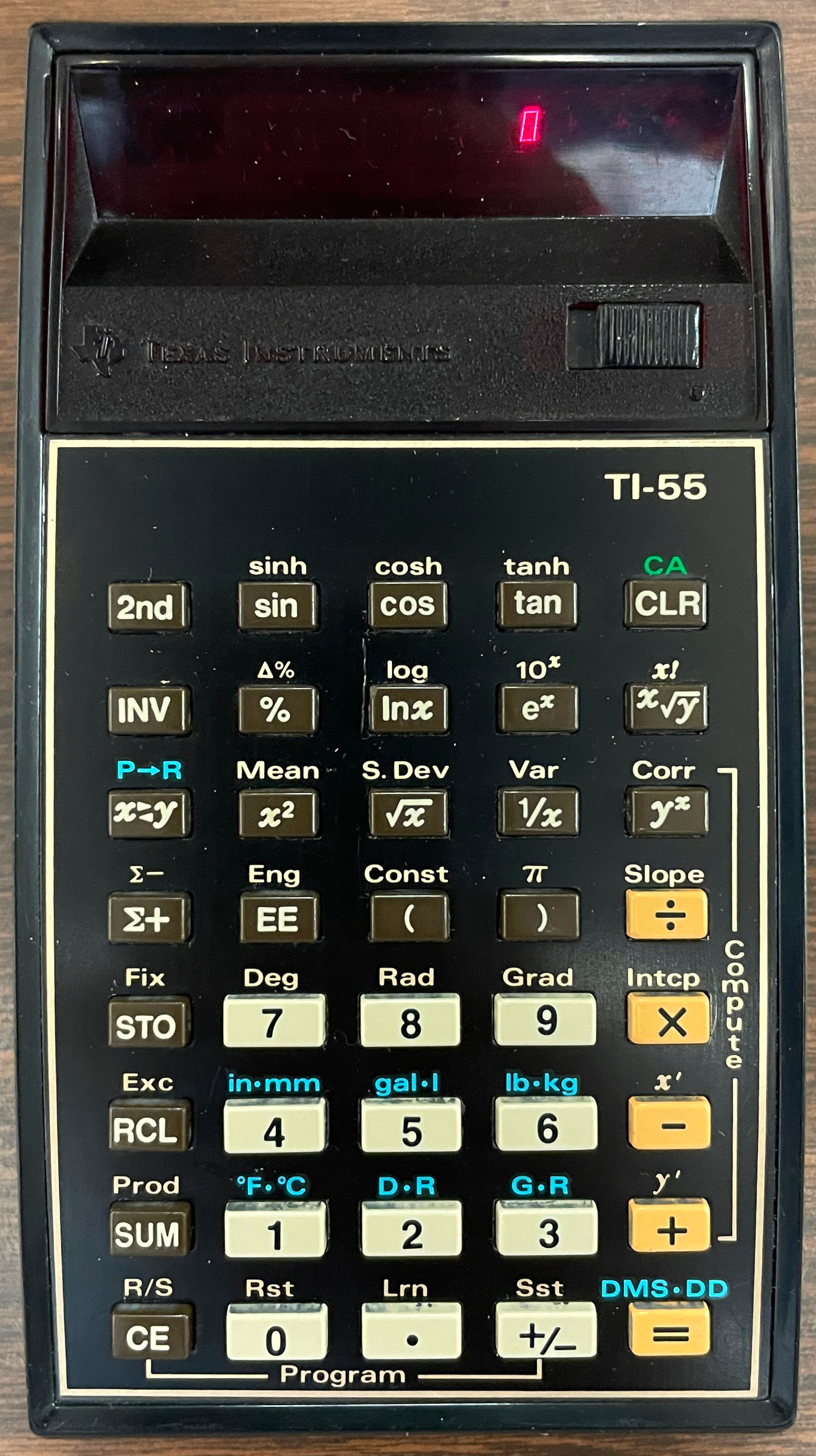
- a TI-55
- Type: Programmable
- Manufacturer: Texas Instruments
- Introduced: 1977
- Discontinued: 1979

Calculator
- Precision: 11 Floating point (within display)
- Display type: LED
- Display size: 8+2

CPU
- Processor: TI TMC1503NL

Other
- Power supply: battery / cells
- Power consumption: 2 LR44's
- Weight: 84 grams (3.0 oz)
- Dimensions: 147 mm × 71 mm × 22 mm (5.8 in × 2.8 in × 0.85 in)

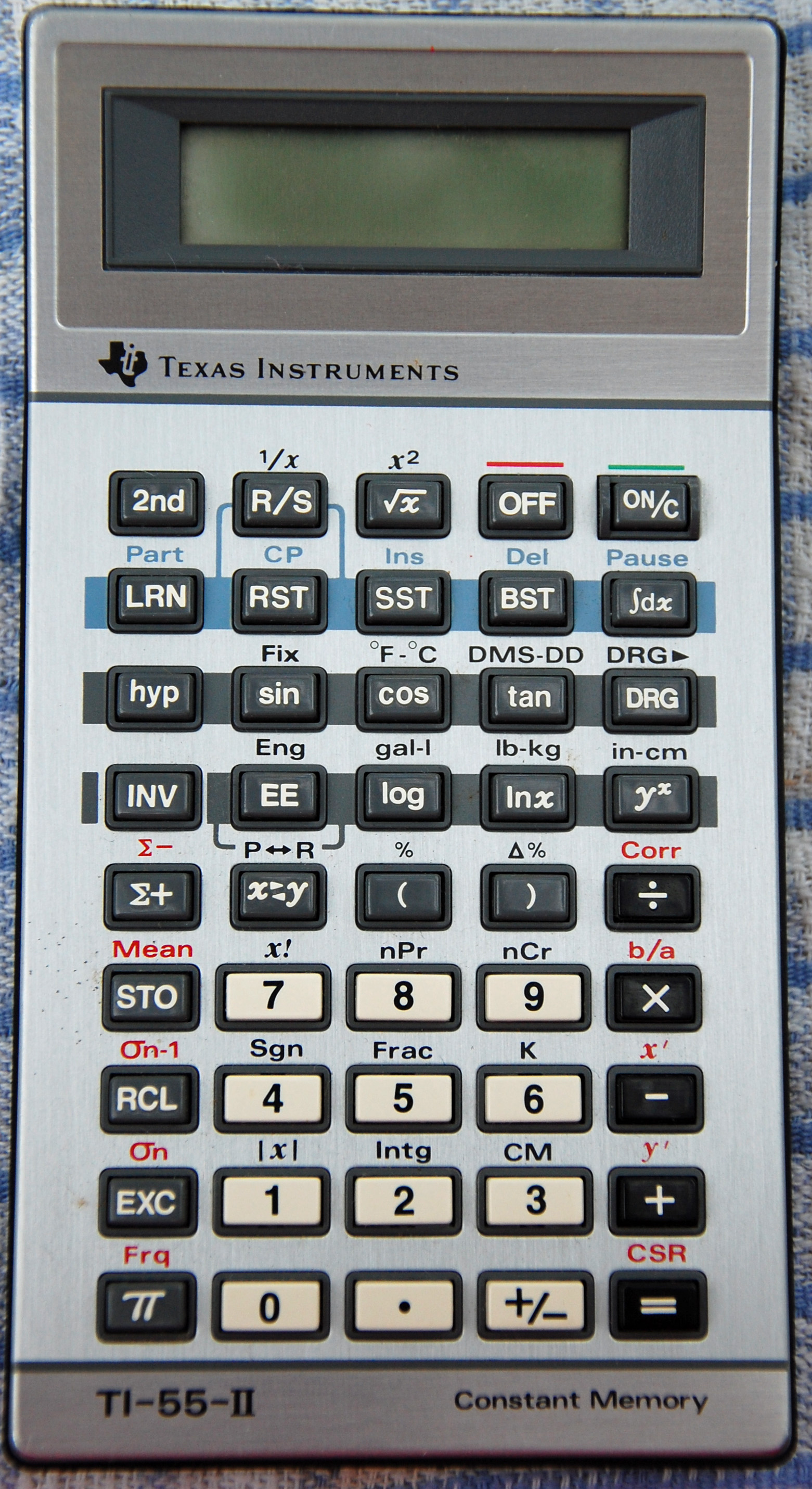
TI-55 II Calculator, the second variant, with an LCD

The TI-55 is a programmable calculator first manufactured by Texas Instruments in 1977. It has an LED display, and weighs 6.4 ounces (180 grams). It is programmable to hold up to 32 key-codes that allow the user to repeat simple calculations with different values.

== Variants ==
=== TI-51 III ===
The TI-55 was sold under the name of TI-51 III in Europe.

=== TI-55 II ===
The TI-55 II (with an LCD) was introduced in 1981, but, like many other Texas Instruments calculators of this time, suffered from serious keyboard reliability problems. Several variants of the TI-55 II exist.

=== TI-55 III ===
The TI-55 III replaced the TI-55 II in the USA in 1986. It features redesigned keyboard mechanics, thereby eliminating the common "bouncing keys" fault of prior models. Several variants of the TI-55 III exist.

=== TI-56 ===
The TI-56 is a European variant of the TI-55 manufactured since 1976.

The SR-56 uses the TMC0501 scalable calculator architecture like the SR-50, SR-51 and SR-52. The TI SR-56 was followed shortly by the TI 57 which is similar in many ways but can not be connected to the PC-100 printer.

Date of introduction: May 21, 1976 Display technology: LED 10 + 2 Size: 5.8" x 3.:;2" x 1.3" 147 x 81 x 32 mm. Weight: 8.5 ounces, 240 grams Jmm Manufacturer: Texas Instruments
