= Bygrave (disambiguation) =

Bygrave is a village and civil parish in the North Hertfordshire district of Hertfordshire, England.

Bygrave or Bygraves may also refer to:

- Adam Bygrave (born 1989), English football defender
- Joe Bygraves (1931–2012), British heavyweight boxer
- Max Bygraves (1922–2012), English comedian and singer
- Phil Bygrave (1929–2012), New Zealand field hockey player
- Rose Bygrave (born 1955), Australian singer and songwriter

== See also ==
- Bygrave slide rule, an eponymous slide rule
