= SR10 =

SR10 or SR-10 may refer to:

- the Texas Instruments SR-10, a predecessor of the TI SR-50 pocket calculator;
- State Route 10, one of several highways numbered 10 worldwide;
- the SR-10, a variant of the Stinson Reliant, a monoplane from the 1930s;
- the KB SAT SR-10, a contemporary Russian jet trainer aircraft.
