= TI SR-50 =

Early scientific pocket calculator

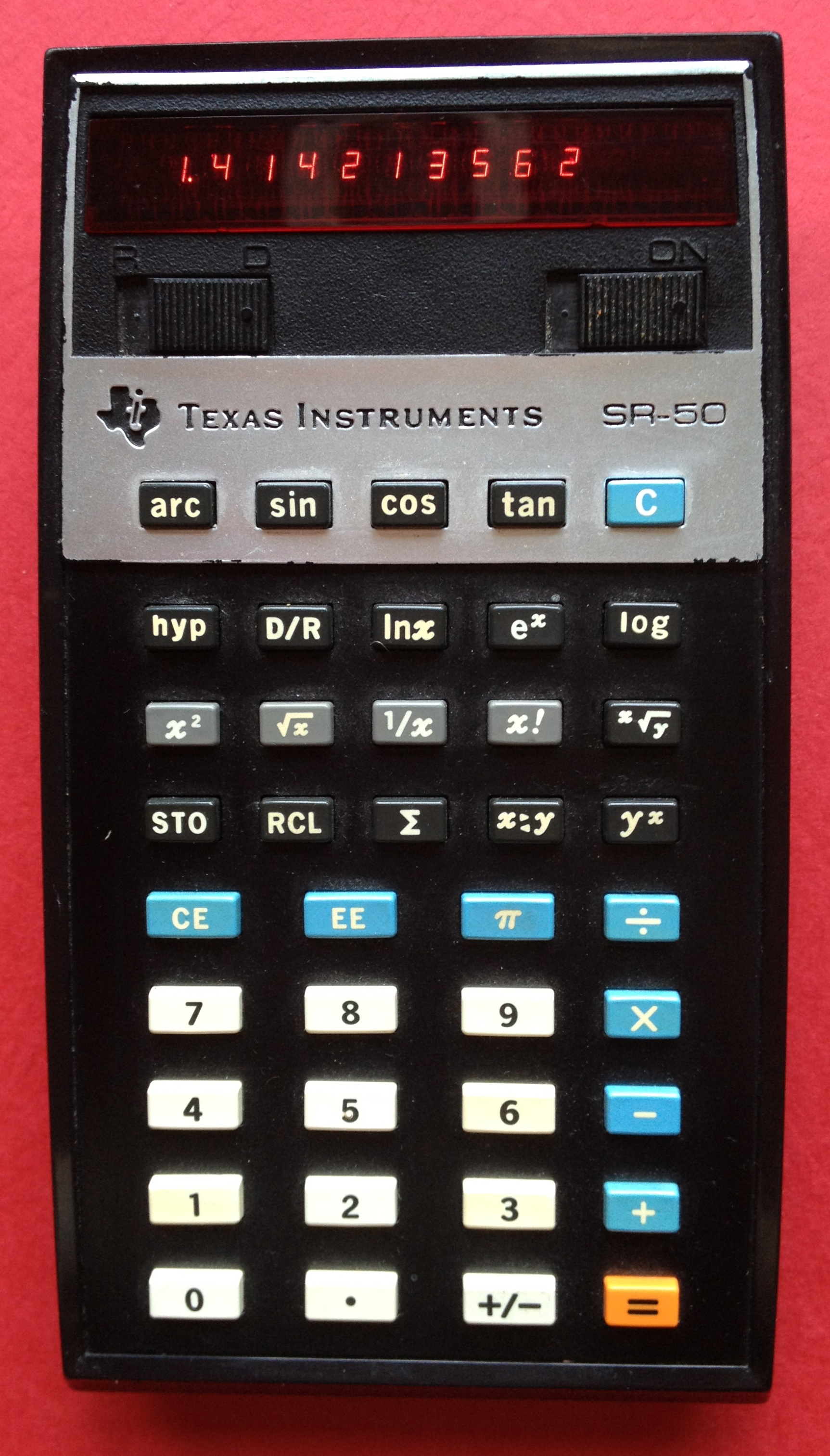
SR-50 (1974)

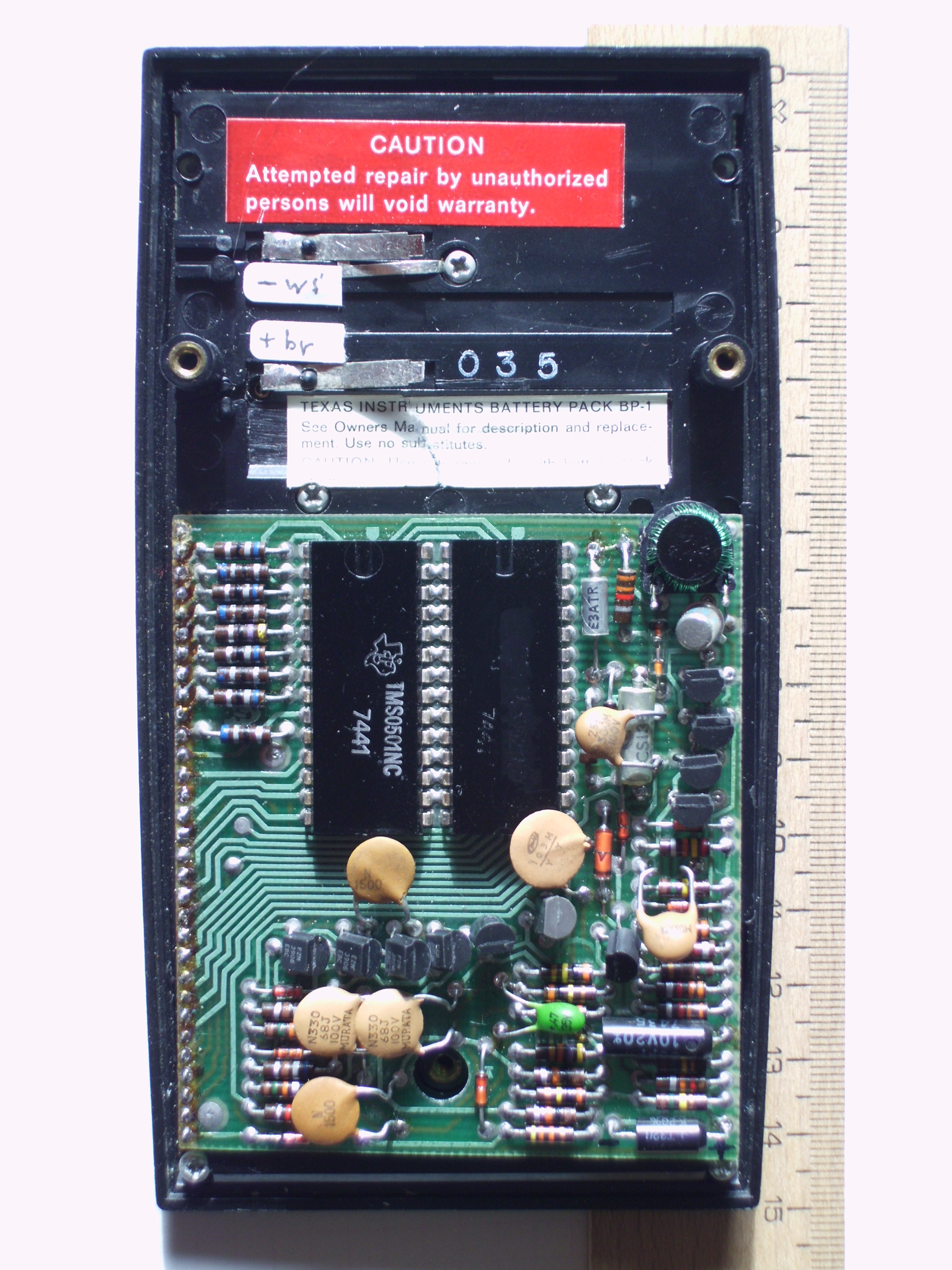
Printed circuit board. Data code 035: 3rd week 1975

The SR-50 is Texas Instruments' first scientific pocket calculator with trigonometric and logarithm functions. It enhanced their earlier SR-10 and SR-11 calculators, introduced in 1973, which had featured scientific notation, squares, square root, and reciprocals, but had no trig or log functions, and lacked other features. The SR-50 was introduced in 1974 and sold for US$170. It competed with the Hewlett-Packard HP-35.

== Design ==
The SR-50 measures 5-3/4 inches long by 3-1/8 inches wide by 1-3/16 inches high (147 mm by 78 mm by 31 mm) and is powered by a rechargeable NiCad battery pack, built from three welded AA cells. It has 40 keys, and flat sliding switches for degrees/radians and on/off. "SR" stands for "slide rule."

The SR-50 has a red LED display with a signed ten-digit mantissa plus a signed two-digit exponent for floating point numbers (negative values were indicated with a leading minus sign and positive values with no sign). Internally, calculations are performed with a 13-digit mantissa, providing much greater calculation accuracy than the 10-digit precision of most scientific calculators of the time. After the leading sign, digits consist of a seven-segment display plus decimal point. A blinking display indicates an error, such as a calculation error or an overflow or underflow condition.

Like most scientific calculators, the SR-50 mostly uses ordinary infix notation, as opposed to the postfix Reverse Polish Notation (RPN) employed by its main competitor, the Hewlett Packard HP-35. The SR-50 follows the standard order of operations by performing unary (single-argument) operations (reciprocal, square, square root, log, trig and hyperbolic trig functions) immediately, and multiplication, division, root, and power operations before addition and subtraction operations. Parameters have to be entered first when using single-argument operations (e. g. 30 sin). As an example, the keypresses to calculate "3 * log(4) + 5" is entered almost as written, namely "3 * 4 log + 5 =". This is because the calculator executes the log function before performing the multiplication operation, and complete the multiplication operation before executing the addition operation. It does so by having unary operations operate on the X register, addition and subtraction operate on the X and Z registers, and multiplication, division, power, and root functions operate on the X and Y registers in its operational stack.

An unusual feature of the SR-50 is that its included functions such as factorial and hyperbolic trig functions, which were found on very few calculators (including the HP-35 and HP-45) at the time. The user invokes the hyperbolic functions by entering the function argument and then pressing the "hyp" key, followed by the "sin", "cos", or "tan" function key. The inverse hyperbolic functions are accessed by first pressing the "arc" and "hyp" keys (in any order) and then pressing the "sin", "cos", or "tan" key. Hyperbolic trig arguments are always assumed to be in radians regardless of the setting of the degree/radian (D/R) mode switch. In addition to its three-register operational stack, consisting of X, Y, and Z registers, the SR-50 also includes one memory (M) register to which the value in the X (display) register could be directly added using the "summation" key. The SR-50 has very fast trig functions (about half a second to evaluate each function) and was a popular calculator to use in contests involving pocket calculators.

== Technical data ==
- ALU (Arithmetic and Logic Unit): TMC0501
- SCOM (Scanning read-only memory): TMC0521
- Display driver: 2 × 27882
- Power: NiCd battery pack BP1 (3.6 V), charger AC9200 or AC9900

== Descendants ==
The SR-50 was followed by the more advanced model SR-51. The SR-51 has the same physical dimensions but added a 2nd function for most buttons. Most notable among the added functions are the ability to enter x:y pairs and do linear regression analysis on them. The later and lighter versions SR-50A and SR-51II and SR-51III are based on smaller ICs and battery packs and reached broadest distribution.

A further update resulted in the programmable model SR-52 in late 1975. It is thicker and longer and can perform 224 program steps recorded on magnetic cards, similar to its competitor HP-65. The card is pulled through the reader by an electric motor. The matte white upper face of the cards can be marked with pen or pencil to indicate the program and the functions assigned to the calculator's programmable keys. The card can be stored in a slot above the programmable keys with its markings visible.

In 1976 Texas Instruments released the TI-30 budget calculator at one-third the price of the SR-50, so sales of the SR-50 quickly dropped.

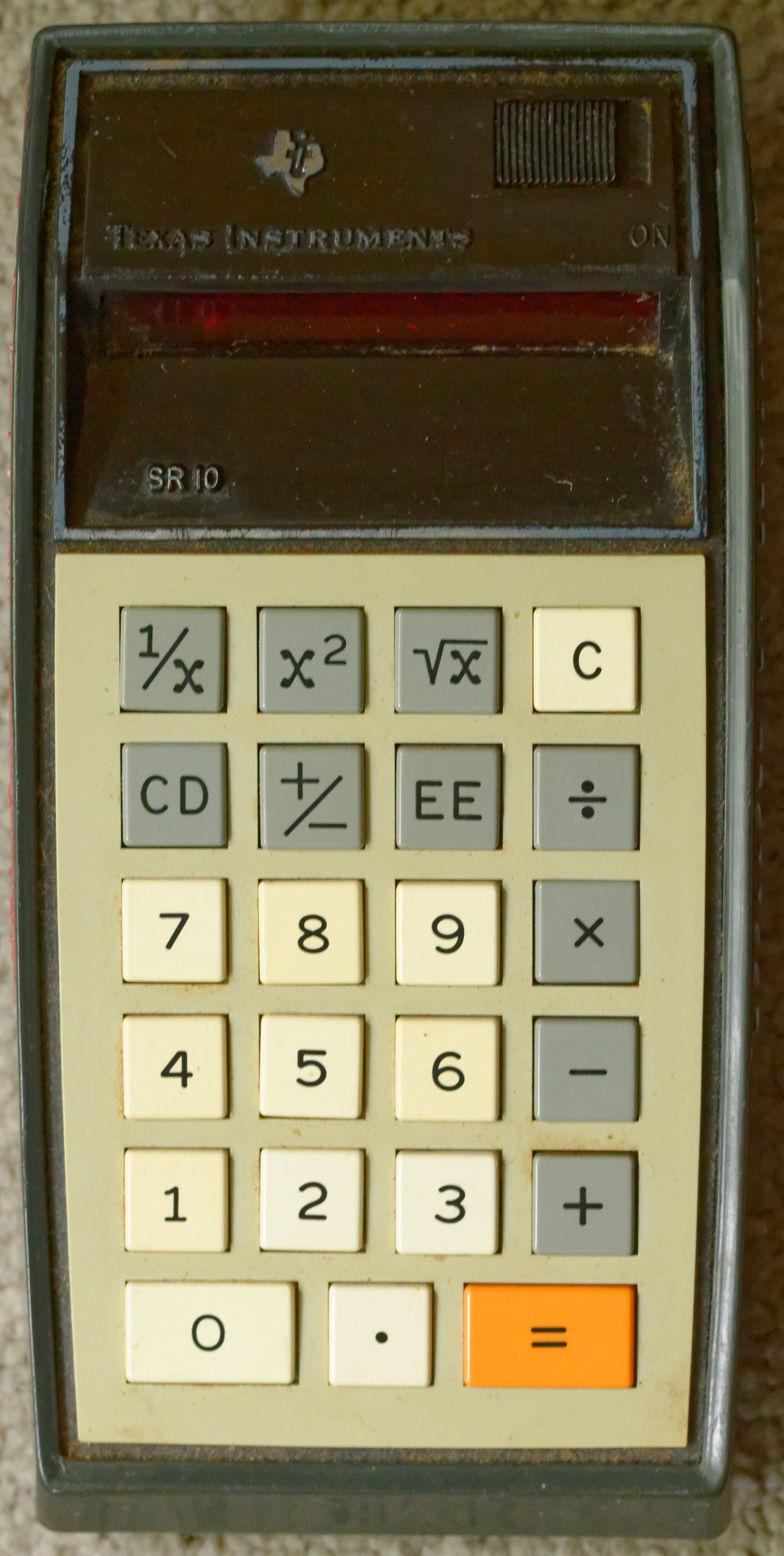
SR-10 (predecessor)

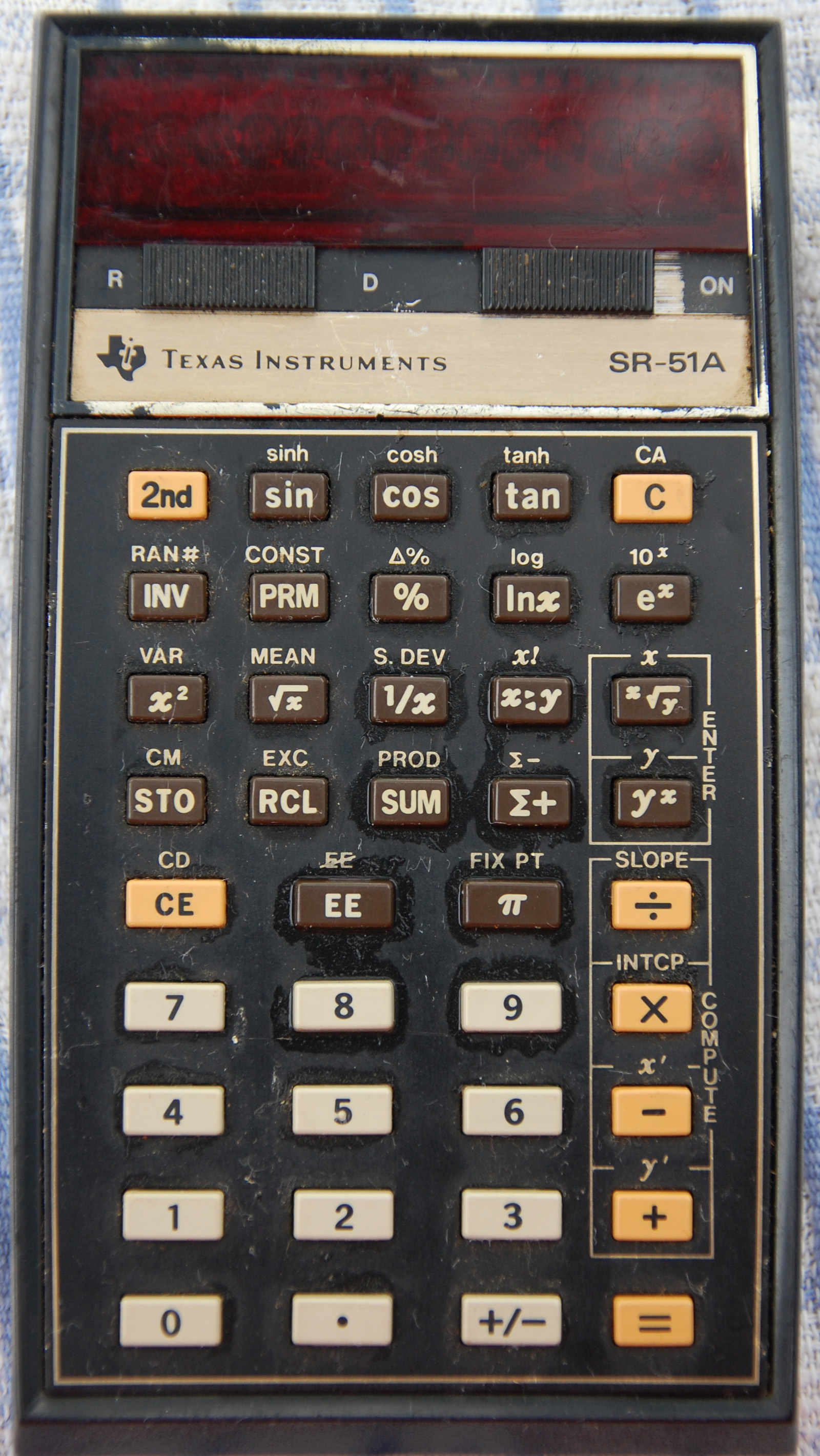
SR-51A with statistical functions

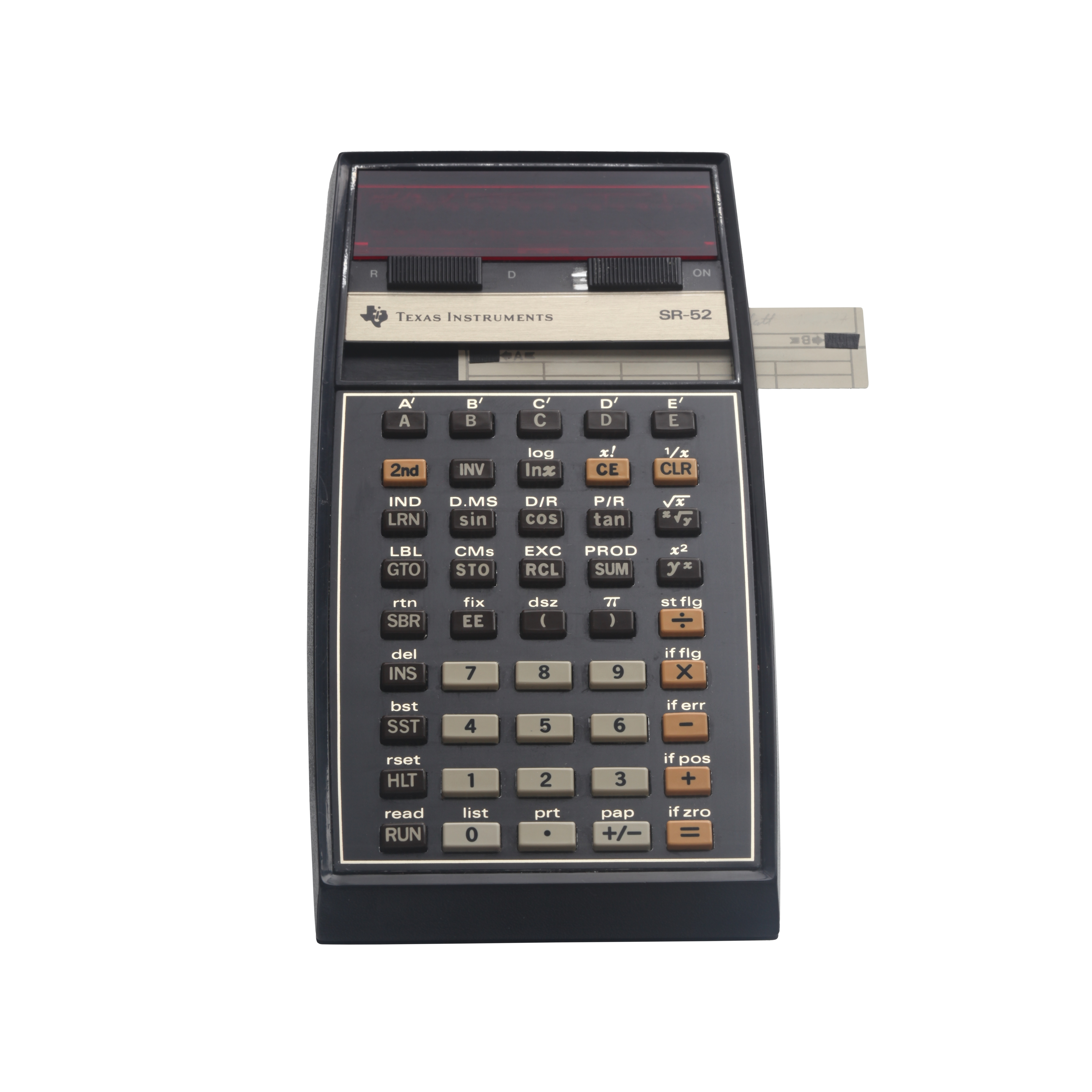
TI SR-52 on display at the Musée Bolo, EPFL, Lausanne.

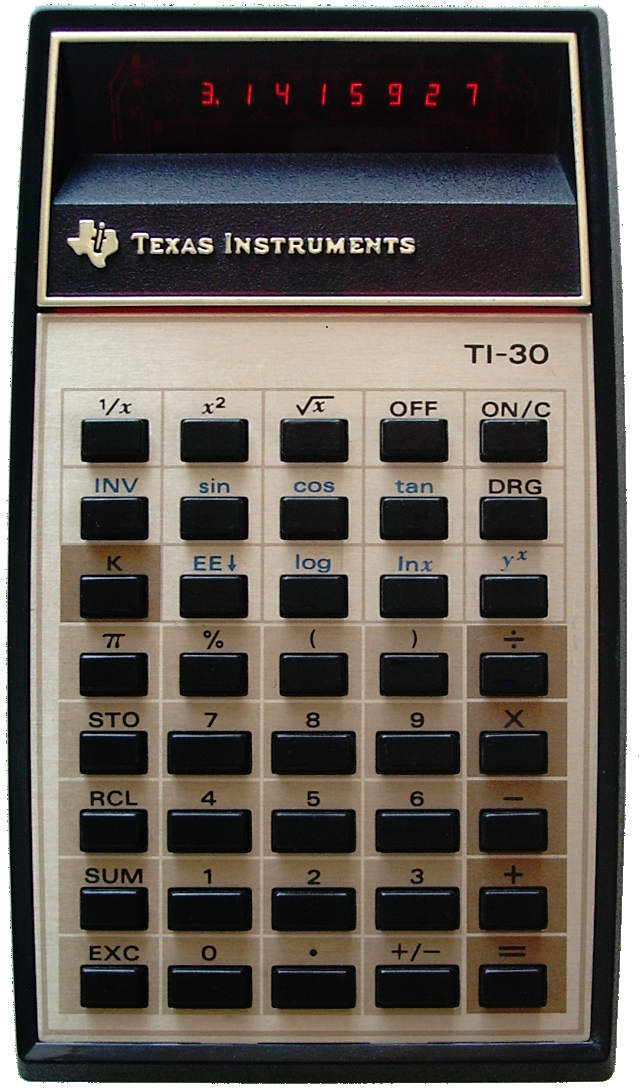
TI-30

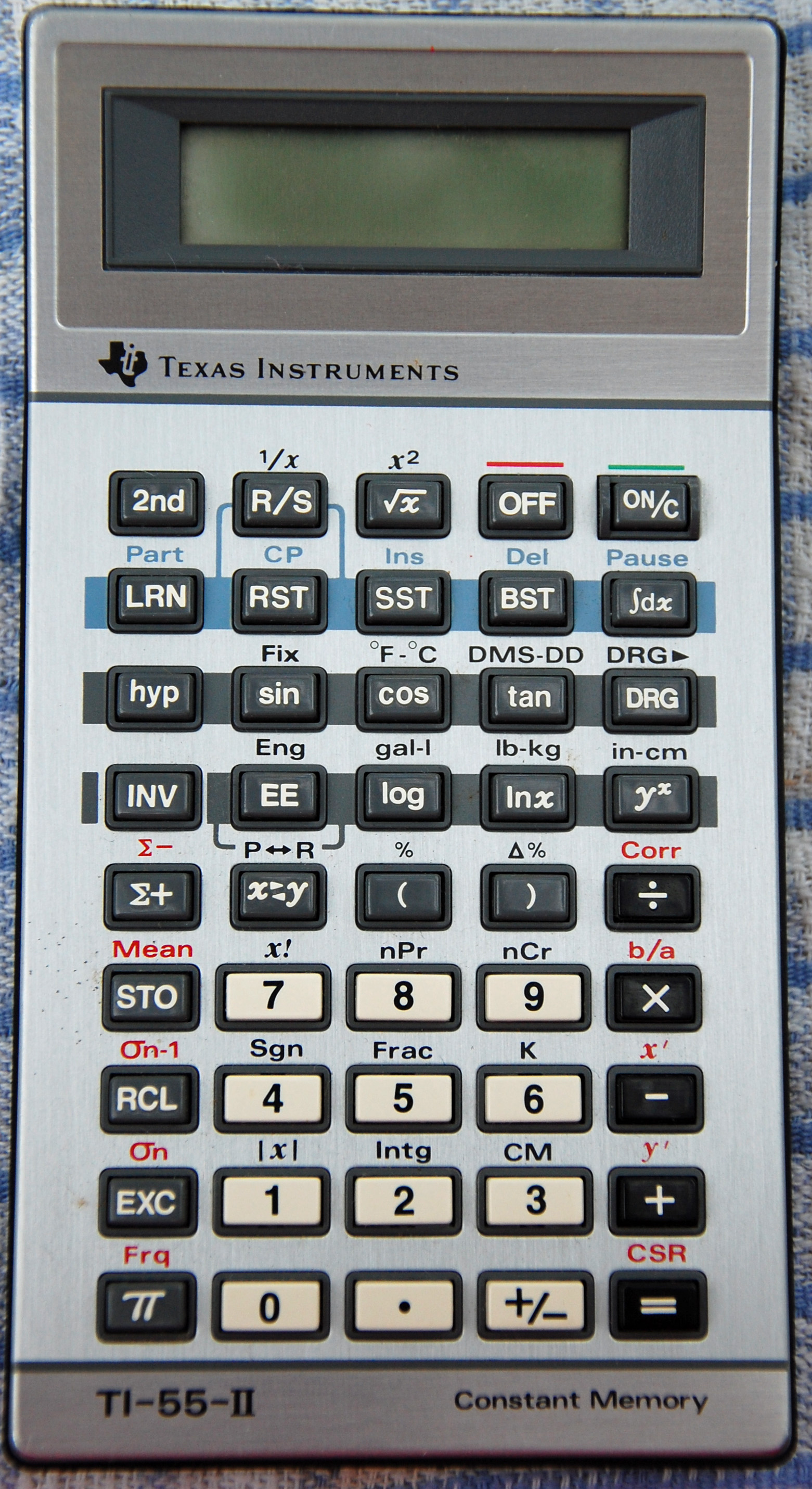
TI-55-II
