= Otis King =

British inventor

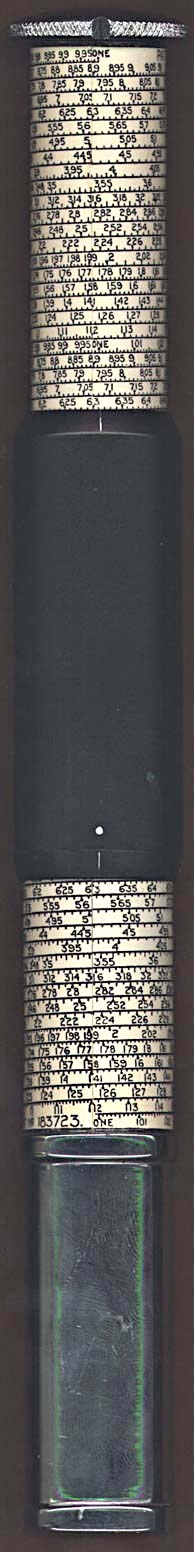
Otis King's patent calculator, model K; Photo by Richard Lyon.

Otis Carter Formby King (1876–1944) was an electrical engineer in London who invented and produced a cylindrical slide rule with helical scales, primarily for business uses initially. The product was named Otis King's Patent Calculator, and was manufactured and sold by Carbic Ltd. in London from about 1922 to about 1972.

With a log-scale decade length of 66 inches, the Otis King calculator should be about a full digit more accurate than a 6-inch pocket slide rule. But due to inaccuracies in tic-mark placement, some portions of its scales will read off by more than they should. For example, a reading of 4.630 might represent an answer of 4.632, or almost one part in 2000 error, when it should be accurate to one part in 6000 (66"/6000 = 0.011" estimated interpolation accuracy).

The Geniac brand cylindrical slide rule sold by Oliver Garfield Company in New York was initially a relabelled Otis King; Garfield later made his own, probably unauthorized version of the Otis King (around 1959). The UK patents covering the mechanical device(s) would have expired in about 1941–1942 (i.e. 20 years after filing of the patent) but copyright in the drawings – which would arguably include the spiral scale layout – would typically only expire 70 years after the author's death.

== Patents ==
- UK patent GB 207,762 (1922)
- UK patent GB 183,723 (1921)
- UK patent GB 207,856 (1922)
- US patent US 1,645,009 (1923)
- Canadian patent CA 241986
- Canadian patent CA 241076
- French patent FR569985
- French patent FR576616
- German patent DE 418814

== See also ==
- Bygrave slide rule
- Fuller's cylindrical slide rule
