= Bygrave slide rule =

Bygrave A.M.L. Position line slide rule Mk. IIA serial No. 355

The Bygrave slide rule is a slide rule named for its inventor, Captain Leonard Charles Bygrave of the RAF. It was used in celestial navigation, primarily in aviation. Officially, it was called the A. M. L. Position Line Slide Rule (A.M.L. for Air Ministry Laboratories).

It was developed in 1920 at the Air Ministry Laboratories at Kensington in London and was produced by Henry Hughes & Son Ltd of London until the mid-1930s. It solved the so-called celestial triangle accurately to about one minute of arc and quickly enough for aerial navigation. The solution of the celestial triangle used the John Napier rules for solution of square-angled spherical triangles. The slide rule was constructed as two coaxial tubes with spiral scales, like the Fuller's cylindrical slide rules, with yet another tube on the outside carrying the cursors.

During the Second World War, a closely related version was produced in Germany by Dennert & Pape as the HR1, MHR1 and HR2.

== Famous users ==
Sir Francis Chichester was a renowned aviator and yachtsman. He used a Bygrave Slide Rule as an aid to navigation during flights in the 1930s, one of which was the first solo flight from New Zealand to Australia in a Gipsy Moth biplane. He later completed a round the world cruise in his yacht Gipsy Moth IV. This was the first solo circumnavigation using the clipper route. Sir Francis Chichester wrote about these exploits in his autobiography, entitled The Lonely Sea and the Sky.

== See also ==
- Otis King's Patent Calculator
