= HP-55 =

Handheld calculator by HP

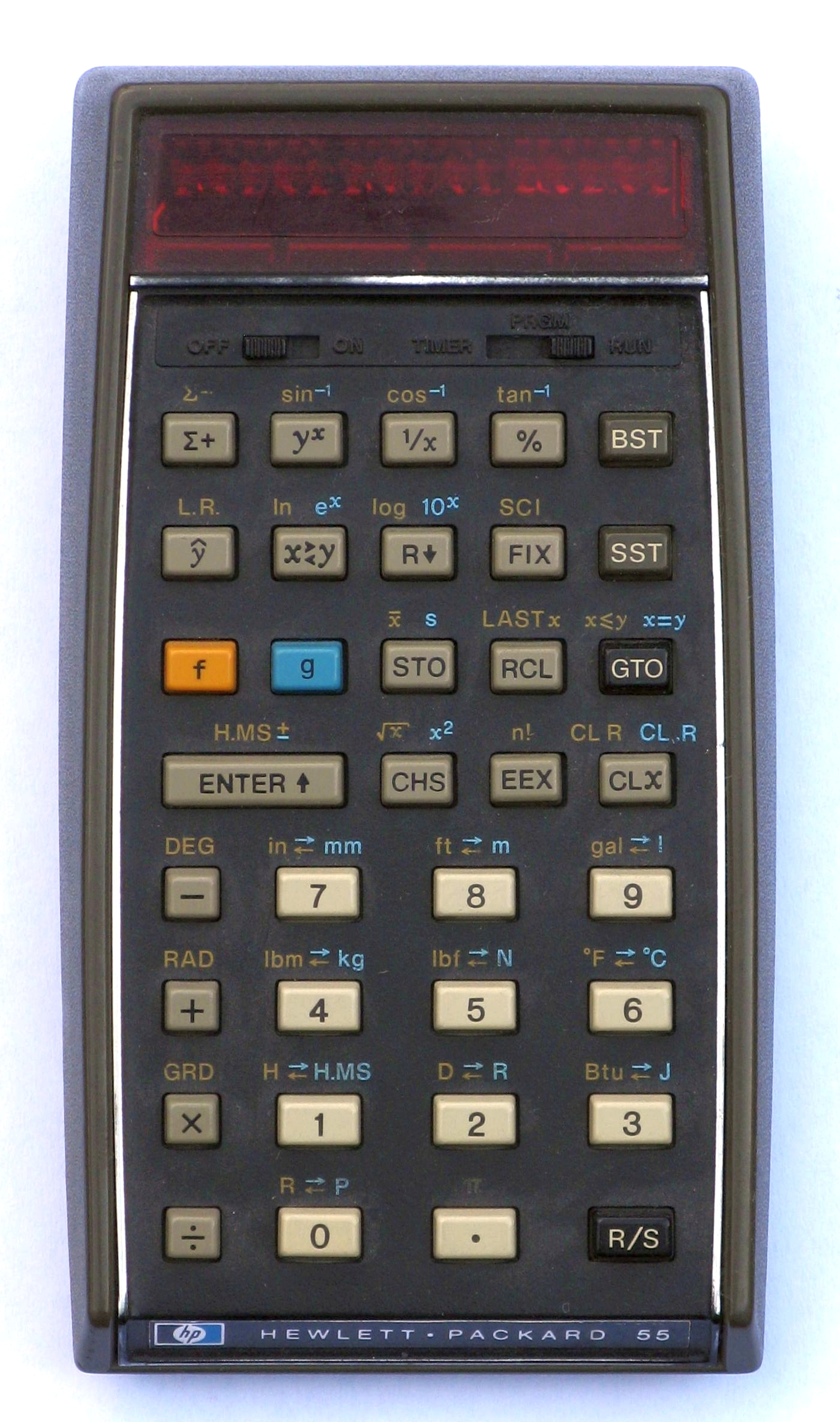
- Type: Programmable
- Introduced: 1975

Calculator
- Entry mode: RPN
- Display type: Red LED seven-segment display
- Display size: 15 digits (decimal point uses one digit), (±10^{±99})

Programming
- Programming language(s): RPN key stroke

Other
- Power supply: Internal rechargeable battery or 115/230 V AC, 5 W
- Weight: Calculator: 9 oz (260 g), recharger: 5 oz (140 g)
- Dimensions: Length: 5.8 inches (150 mm), width: 3.2 inches (81 mm), height: 0.7–1.3 inches (18–33 mm)

The HP-55 was a programmable handheld calculator, a lower-cost alternative to the HP-65. Introduced by Hewlett-Packard in 1975, it featured twenty storage registers and room for 49 keystroke instructions. Its outward appearance was similar to the HP-65, but its silver band went through between the display and the keyboard like HP-45, and the functions of some keys were different from HP-65, and it did not have a magnetic card reader/writer. Like all Hewlett-Packard calculators of the era and most since, the HP-55 used Reverse Polish Notation (RPN) and a four-level automatic operand stack.

Another feature of the HP-55 was that it officially featured a stop-watch function much similar to the hidden stop-watch function of the earlier HP-45 calculator. This stop-watch function could be accessed by setting the mode-slider to the Timer position. A quartz-crystal inside the calculator provided an accurate timebase, and it was advertised that the timer ran with as little as +/- 0.01% error. The data format used by the stop-watch consisted of a combination of units (Hours, Minutes and Seconds), but the HP-55 featured a special conversion function to convert between this format and a pure unit (Hours). Because of this, data from the stop-watch could easily be used right away in calculations.

The HP-55 also featured several other conversion functions to instantly convert data between the Imperial and Metric systems.

Bill Hewlett's design requirement was that the calculator should fit in his shirt pocket. That is one reason for the tapered depth of the calculator. The documentation for the programs in the calculator is complete, including algorithms for hundreds of applications, including the solutions of differential equations, stock price estimation, statistics, and so forth.

== See also ==
- HP-45
- HP-65
