= France Rode =

Slovenian engineer and inventor

- Born: November 20, 1934
- Died: June 7, 2017 (aged 82)
- Occupations: Engineer, inventor
- Known for: Working on HP-35 pocket calculator

France Rode (November 20, 1934 – June 7, 2017) was a Slovenian engineer and inventor best known for his work on the HP-35 pocket calculator. He was one of the four lead engineers at Hewlett-Packard assigned to this project.

Rode also invented and created the first workable RFID products: workplace entry cards, for which he held several patents.

== Early life ==
Rode was born in Nožice, Slovenia on November 20, 1934, to farmers father Jože and mother Pepca, born Prešeren, as the oldest of four children. His younger sister Agata and brothers Marko and Aleš completed the family. Rode started elementary school education in nearby Homec soon after the German occupation of Slovenia during the Second World War. A few months into the first school year the local Partisans burned the school building and the children were prevented from attending formal schooling for the duration of the war. After the war, until the school in Homec was rebuilt, Rode’s class met in the local church rectory or in a Gasthouse in the mornings and reported for work at the school construction site in the afternoon. Due to an accelerated learning program, Rode completed the fourth grade in Homec in 1947 and in the fall of the same year began attending high school in Kamnik. He skipped the fifth grade by studying and passing exams designed for the fifth grade during the summer months.

== Education and academic interests ==
His academic interests at that time were in mathematics, physics and natural sciences. Whenever he had to study, Rode was excused from farm work. However, living on the farm allowed him no time for extracurricular activities for which he envied his schoolmates. Only occasionally he managed to join his peers after school. His fondest memories of such activities include participating in the staging of Hamlet, directed by Ciril Gostič, brother of operas singer Jože Gostič, Rode’s godfather. His nostalgic memories also include skiing trips to Mala Planina and staying with his ski buddies in “Steletova koča.”

Living on the farm did have some side benefits. Rode learned hard work habits and discovered his inventive drive. In his uncle’s carpentry shop next door, he built his own toys and later tools that were otherwise too expensive to buy. He made the slide rule he used during all his academic years in Ljubljana.

Rode planned to study mathematics at Ljubljana University, but altered his interest to electrical engineering after he visited the University’s electrical engineering laboratories. He never regretted this switch. He felt that in this field he would be able to combine his interest in mathematics with some hands-on work.

== Early work ==
Rode’s early contact with the world outside Slovenia (which was at that time part of Yugoslavia), were two summer jobs in Germany and a few school excursions. These contacts subsequently led him to visit companies in Sweden, Denmark, the Netherlands, and Germany, which exposed him to advanced technologies of that era. They also triggered in him a desire to learn more about new places and people. Soon after his graduation in Ljubljana, he filed an application at Northwestern University in Evanston, Illinois and in November 1960 he boarded the Slovenian ship Bohinj.

Rode earned a master's degree in bio-medicine at Northwestern University in 1962. In September of the same year he joined Hewlett-Packard Company in Palo Alto, California where he worked periodically for over twenty years.

== Pioneering work on pocket calculator ==
Rode’s subsequent contribution was as important for HP as the former. It consisted of the first integrated circuit designed within the company. The engineers and management were awaiting the arrival of the processed chip, which came from Rode’s cutting and pasting of the layout. Rode designed the miniature processor for HP-35, the first scientific pocket calculator. While he did not get the recognition of having designed the first microprocessor in the world, Rode’s HP-35 calculating unit had all the characteristics associated with a microprocessor. It had a complete instruction set for controlling its arithmetic units. The algorithms for trigonometric and logarithmic algorithms took advantage of this instruction set which opened the door to a new type of pocket calculator.

Using the same hardware as the HP-35, Rode designed the HP-80 business calculator, that replaced reams of tables used to compute mortgages, returns on investments and other business transactions with a dedicated keyboard. Rode also foresaw the need for a laptop-style computer and has proposed and then led to completion the development of the briefcase computer.

Hewlett-Packard oscilloscopes had a poor reputation and the top management asked the central Research & Development Laboratory to do something about it. A new promising concept called for an integrated processor and Rode was asked to help. For him this was such an easy task that he found time to enrich the final prototype named “Smart Scope” with many vital ideas, which later became topics of his doctoral dissertation in 1975.

== Entrepreneurial path ==
In 1979 Rode established the company Sielox Inc., which was to develop electronic locks and security devices based on one of his patents. In the same pursuit he also established cooperative relationship with Ljubljana University and with the Slovenian microelectronics firm ISKRA for purposes of manufacturing the required microchips. In 1986 Sielox was acquired by Checkpoint Systems, and Rode became their R&D vice president. In 1990 he moved to Trimble Navigation, where he participated in efforts to embed the new satellite based navigation GPS into airplanes and with additional equipment enable them for blind landing. During the last two years at Trimble Navigation, Rode was heavily involved with attempts to redesign and then integrate the GPS receiver into only two chips. This effort led him to join his two coworkers who established a new company called eRide Inc. Their goal was to design novel GPS receivers, which would make it possible to navigate under diverse conditions such as inside the buildings or in other reflective environments but primarily inside a wristwatch.

== Awards ==
His contribution to the development of HP-35, the first handheld scientific calculator, was publicly honored as part of the IEEE Milestone in Electrical Engineering and Computing celebration held at Hewlett Packard, Palo Alto in April 2009.

== Patents ==
HP-01

- 3,973,110 Circulating shift register time-keeping circuit

HP-45

- 4,001,569 General purpose calculator having selective data storage, data conversion, and time-keeping capabilities
- 4,035,627 Scientific calculator
- 4,047,012 General purpose calculator having factorial capability
- 4,059,750 General purpose calculator having selective data storage, data conversion and time-keeping capabilities

HP-80

- 3,955,074 General purpose calculator having keys with more than one function assigned thereto
- 3,946,218 General purpose calculator with capability for performing yield-to-maturity of a bond calculation
- 3,863,060 General Purpose Calculator with Capability for Performing Interdisciplinary Business Calculations

RFID-based Security products, Sielox Systems, Inc

- 3,944,976 Electronic Security Apparatus
- 4,727,369 Electronic lock and key system
- 4,918,416 Electronic Proximity Identification system
- 5,103,210 Activatable/deactivatable security tag for use with an electronic security system

GPS and navigation

- 7,019,689 Skipping z-counts and accurate time in GPS receivers
- 7,123,190 Skipping z-counts and accurate time in GPS receivers
- 7,362,263 Keeping accurate time for a hybrid GPS receiver and mobile phone when powered off
- 7,450,062 Keeping accurate time for a hybrid GPS receiver and mobile phone when powered off
- 7,592,951 Device and method for minimizing the number of crystal oscillators used in an integrated navigation receiver and cell phone
- 7,598,909 Keeping accurate time for a hybrid GPS receiver and mobile phone when powered off

Measurement instruments

- 3,609,326 Counting apparatus and method using separate counters for reference and unknown signal
- 4,099,240 Method & Apparatus for programmable and remote numeric control and calibration of electronic instrumentation
- 4,162,531 Method and apparatus for programmable and remote numeric control and calibration of electronic instrumentation
- 6,157,818 Communication system having automatic addressing
