= Fuller calculator =

Advanced type of slide rule

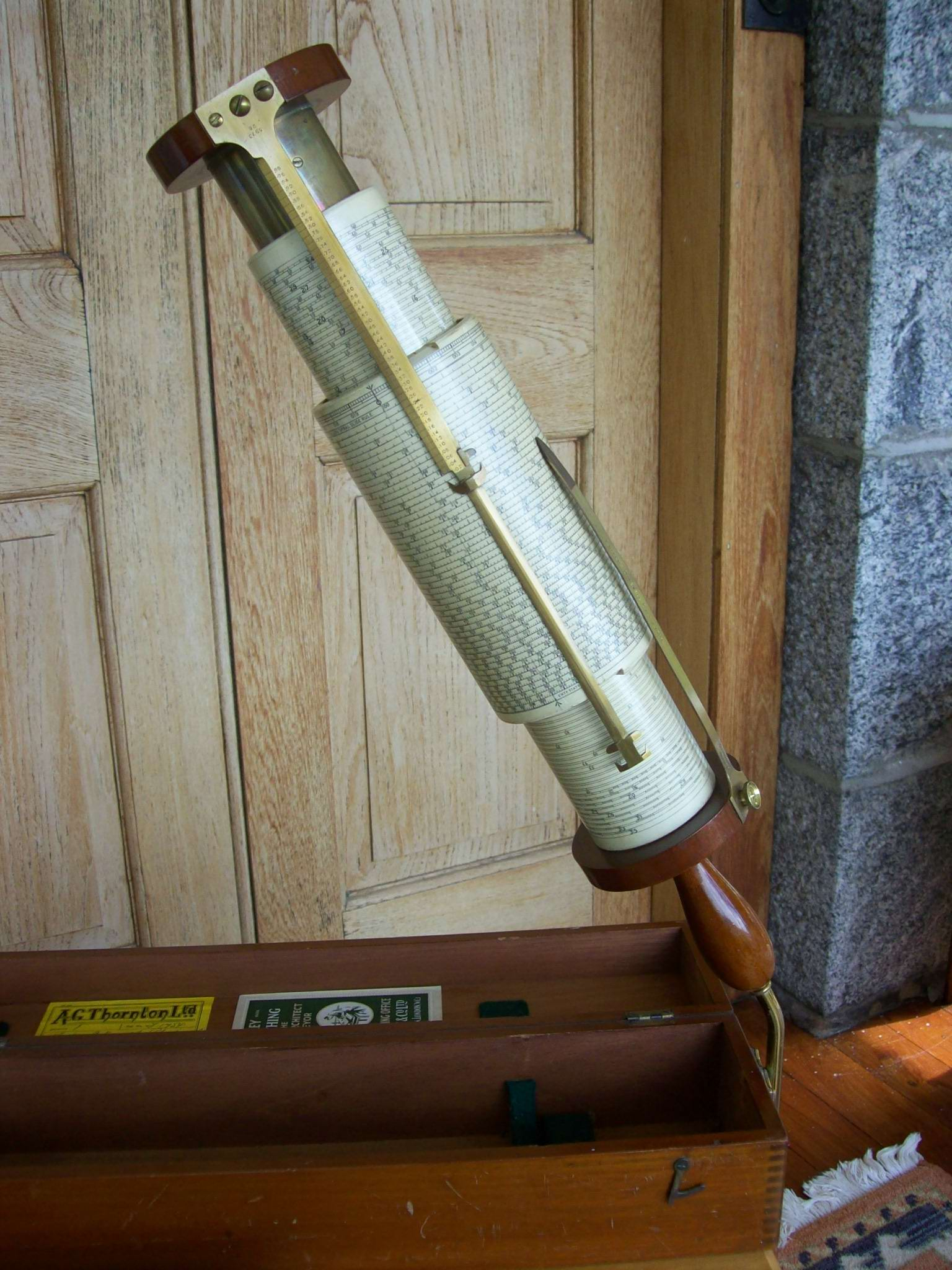
Fuller calculator, Fuller-Bakewell model of 1928

The Fuller calculator, sometimes called Fuller's cylindrical slide rule, is a cylindrical slide rule with a helical main scale taking 50 turns around the cylinder. This creates an instrument of considerable precision – it is equivalent to a traditional slide rule 25.40 metres (1,000 inches) long. It was invented in 1878 by George Fuller, professor of engineering at Queen's University Belfast, and despite its size and price it remained on the market for nearly a century because it outperformed nearly all other slide rules.

Like other slide rules, the Fuller is limited to calculations based on multiplication and division with additional scales allowing for trigonometrical and exponential functions. The mechanical calculators produced in the same era were generally restricted to addition and subtraction with only advanced versions, like the Arithmometer, able to multiply and divide. Even these advanced machines could not perform trigonometry or exponentiation and they were bigger, heavier and much more expensive than the Fuller. In the mid-twentieth century the handheld Curta mechanical calculator became available which also competed in convenience and price. However, for scientific calculations the Fuller remained viable until 1973 when it was made obsolete by the HP-35 handheld scientific electronic calculator.

== Design ==
=== Model 1, the standard model ===
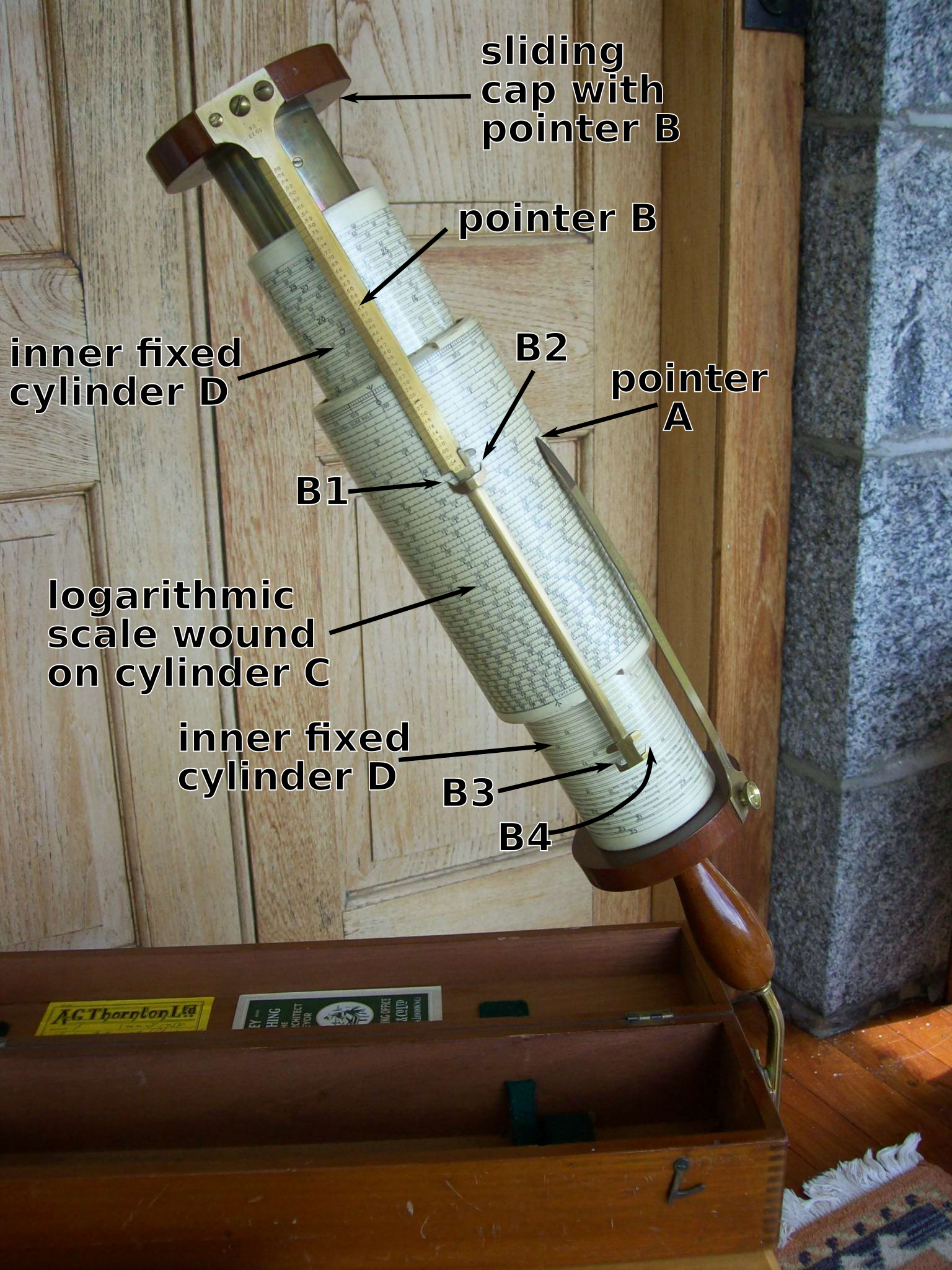
Fuller calculator, annotated

In essence, the calculator consists of three separate hollow cylindrical parts that can twist and slide over each other about a common axis without any tendency to slip. The following details describe the version made between 1921 and 1935. There is a papier-mâché cylinder (marked D in the annotated photograph) some 30 centimetres (12 inches) long and 6.2 centimetres (2.4 in) in diameter fastened to a mahogany handle. A second papier-mâché cylinder (marked C) – 16.3 centimetres (6.4 in) long and 8.1 centimetres (3.2 in) diameter – is a slide fit over the first. Both cylinders are covered in paper varnished with shellac. The second, outer, cylinder is printed with the slide rule's primary logarithmic scale in the form of a 50-turn helix 12.70 metres; 500 inches (41 ft 8 in) long with annotations on the scale going from 100 to 1000. A brass tube with a mahogany cap at the top is a slide fit into the first cylinder.

A brass pointer with an engraved index marker at its tip (marked A) is attached to the handle so that it points to a place on the primary logarithmic scale, depending on the position to which the scale on cylinder C has been adjusted. A second brass pointer (marked B) is attached to the top cap pointing down over the logarithmic scale and it is positioned by rotating and sliding the cap at the top. This pointer has four index marks (marked B1, B2, B3, B4) such that whichever one is convenient may be used. Printed on the inner cylinder D are simply tables of data for reference purposes.

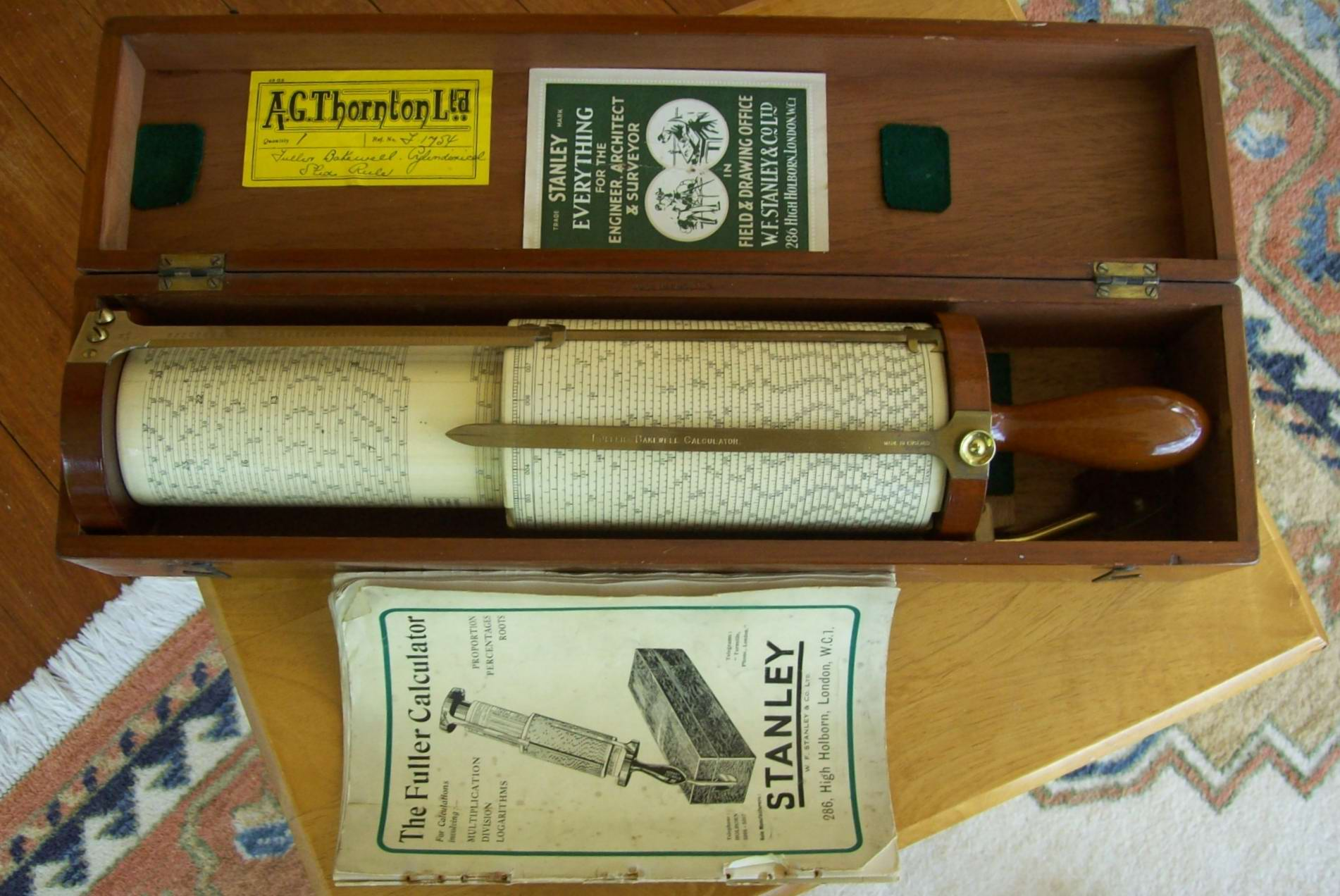
Fuller calculator in case

The calculator was sold in a hinged mahogany case 46 by 12 by 11 centimetres (18.1 in × 4.7 in × 4.3 in) which, if required, holds the instrument when in use by means a brass support that can be latched to the outer end of the case. Out of its case the calculator weighs about 900 grams (32 oz). For all except the earliest instruments the last two digits of the date and a serial number, believed to be consecutively allocated, are stamped at the top of pointer B.

=== Other Fuller models ===
The calculator described above was called "Model No. 1" . Model 2 had scales on the inner cylinder for calculating logs and sines. The "Fuller-Bakewell" model 3 had two scales of angles printed on the inner cylinder to calculate cosine² and sine⋅cosine (Note: The ⋅ means multiplication. The ⋅ is the mid-line dot operator.) for use by engineers and surveyors for tacheometry calculations. (Note: Stadiametric rangefinding: for an anallactic tacheometer with its vernier scale reading zero for a horizontal line of sight, the distance to a vertical stadia rod (d) and the height of the stadia rod above the tacheometer (v) may be calculated as follows. d = K.S cos^{2}α and v = K.S sinα.cosα where K is a constant of the tacheometer (normally 100), S is the difference in height on the stadia rod as intercepted by the tacheometer's cross hairs (the stadia interval) and α is the vertical angle measured by the tacheometer.) A smaller model with a 5.1 metres (200 in) scale was available for a short time but very few survive. In about 1935 the brass tube was replaced by one of phenolic resin and in about 1945 the mahogany was replaced by Bakelite.

Included in Stanley's 1912 catalogue and continuing there until 1958 was Barnard's Coordinate calculator. It is very similar in construction to the Fuller instruments but its pointers have multiple indices so additional trigonometrical functions can be used. It cost slightly less than the Fuller-Bakewell and a 1919 example is held by the Science Museum, London. In 1962 the Whythe-Fuller complex number calculator was introduced. As well as being able to multiply and divide complex numbers it can convert between Cartesian and polar coordinates.

=== Comparison with other slide rules and contemporaneous calculators ===
The calculator's unusual single-scale design (Note: There is a single scale for multiplication and division. The other ancillary scales are for other purposes (transcendental functions).) makes its 12.70-metre (500-inch) helical spiral equivalent to a scale twice this length on a traditional slide rule – 25.40 metres (1,000 inches) long. The scale can always be read to four significant figures and often to five. In 1900 William Stanley, whose firm manufactured and sold scientific instruments including the Fuller calculator, described the slide rule as "possibly the highest refinement in this class of rules".

When it was introduced the Fuller calculator had a much greater precision than other slide rules although the Thacher instrument became available a couple of years later. This was made in the United States and was comparable in size and precision but radically different in design. However, both of these types of slide rule required some skill to operate accurately compared with mechanical calculators which manipulated exact numerical digits rather than using positioning and reading from a graduated scale. Mechanical calculators could only add and subtract (which the Fuller did not do at all) although models such as the Arithmometer could perform all four functions of elementary arithmetic. No mechanical calculators could calculate transcendental functions, which slide rules could be designed to do, and they were bigger, heavier and much more expensive than any slide rule, including the Fuller.

However, a revolutionary miniature mechanical calculator went on sale in the mid-twentieth century – while Curt Herzstark had been imprisoned in a Nazi concentration camp in World War II he had developed the design of the handheld Curta mechanical calculator. It was simple to use and, being digital, was completely accurate. Because of these advantages and despite its somewhat higher price its total sales were 150,000 – over ten times more than the Fuller. Its range of mathematical calculations was seen as being adequate. However, for scientific calculations the Fuller remained viable until 1973 when, along with the Curta, it was made obsolete by the Hewlett-Packard HP-35 handheld scientific electronic calculator.

== Invention, sales and demise ==
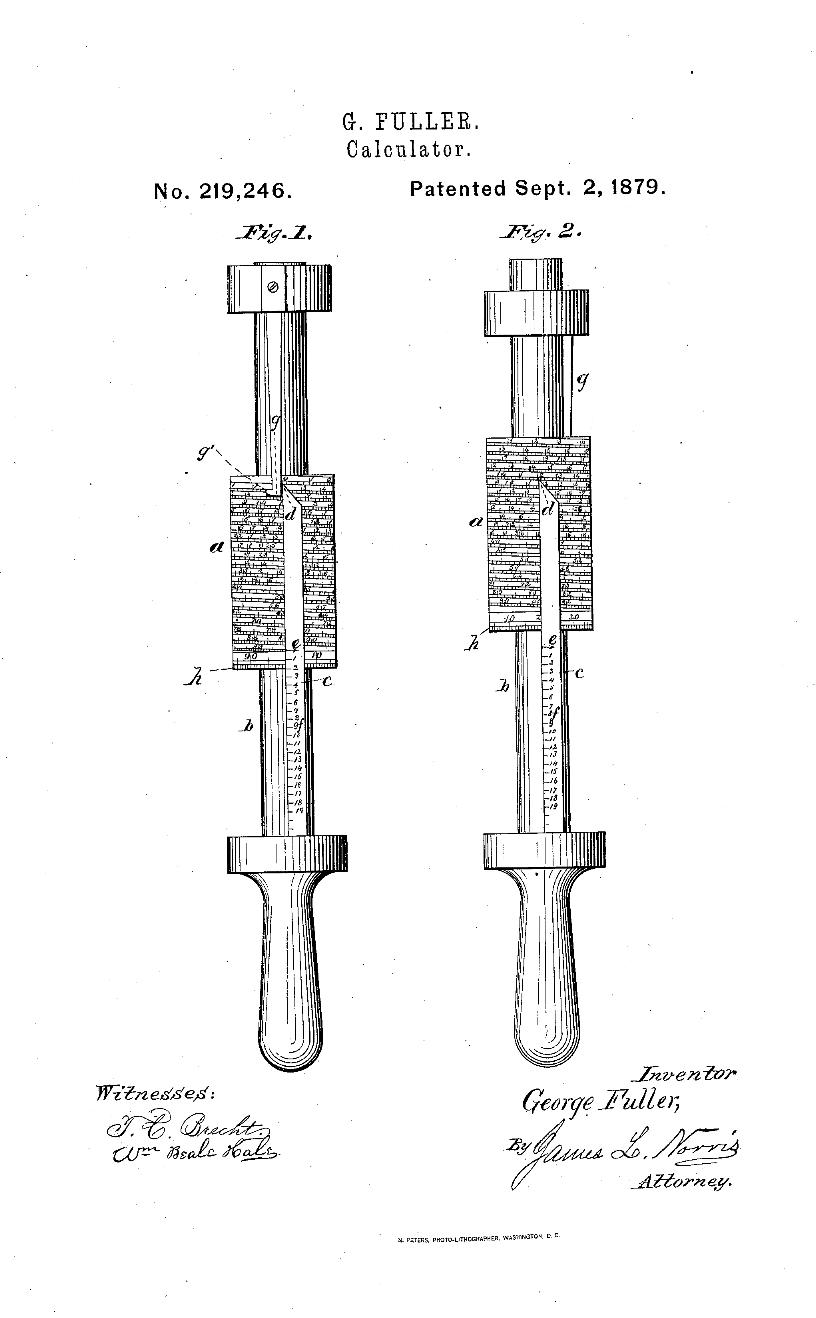
Fuller's 1879 U.S. patent drawing

The calculator was invented by George Fuller (1829–1907), professor of engineering at Queen's University Belfast (Queen's College at that time). He patented it in Britain in 1878, described it in Nature in 1879 and in that year he also patented it the United States, depositing a patent model.

Fuller's calculators were manufactured by the scientific instrument maker W.F. Stanley & Co. of London who made nearly 14,000 between 1878 and 1973.

In Britain the prices charged by W.F. Stanley in 1900 were for model 1 £3 (equivalent to £410 in 2023) and for model 3 £4 10s. (Note: In 1907 and 1916 W.F. Stanley sold both model 1 and model 2 for £3 15s (for 1907 £501 in 2023, for 1916 £321 in 2023) and the Fuller-Bakewell model 3 for £4 10s (for 1907 £601 in 2023, for 1916 £385 in 2023). The firm A.G. Thornton in Manchester made slide rules and also sold the Fuller – their 1916 pricelist shows £3 3s 6d (£272 in 2023) for model 1, £3 19s 0d for model 2 and £4 15s 0d for model 3. Thornton's 1916 price for the Thacher was £7 18s 6d (£677 in 2023).) The Whythe-Fuller model was advertised in a 1962 W.F. Stanley catalogue at £21 (£566 in 2023). The calculator was still listed in Stanley's catalogue in 1976 (Note: Production stopped in 1973 but the calculators remained on sale.) when model 1 cost £60 (£545 in 2023) and model 2 was £61.25.

In the United States the instrument was marketed by Keuffel and Esser who only supplied model 1. They described it as "Fuller's Spiral Slide Rule" and, over the period it was sold between 1895 and 1927, it rose in price from $28 to $42 (falling from $1084 to $778 in 2025 prices). (Note: In 1902 "Thacher's calculating instrument" was priced at $35 (plus $10 for a reading glass).)

From the time when serial numbers were first stamped (about 1900) to when production ceased in 1973 around 14,000 instruments were made. (Note: The ones sold in the U.S. were made in Britain and were numbered in the same way.) Production was about 180 per year overall but it declined after about 1955. In 1949 Encyclopædia Britannica, noting that the Fuller had been designed in 1878, reported that it "has been in considerable use up to the present time".

In 1958 the mathematician and physicist Douglas Hartree (Note: Hartree had worked on ENIAC back in 1946.) wrote that the Fuller "... is cheap compared with a desk machine (Note: By "desk machine" Hartree meant a desktop calculator that could perform multiplication as well as addition and subtraction.) and may be found very useful in work for which its accuracy is adequate and in circumstances in which the cost of a desk machine is prohibitive. [...] With one of these slide-rules and an adding machine much useful numerical work can be done ...". In 1968 the standard Fuller cost about $50 at a time when an electronic Hewlett-Packard HP 9100A desktop calculator (weighing 40 pounds (18 kg)) cost just under $5000. But in 1972 Hewlett-Packard introduced the HP-35, the first handheld calculator with scientific functions, at $395 – the Fuller went out of production the next year.

== Operation ==
=== Multiplication and division ===
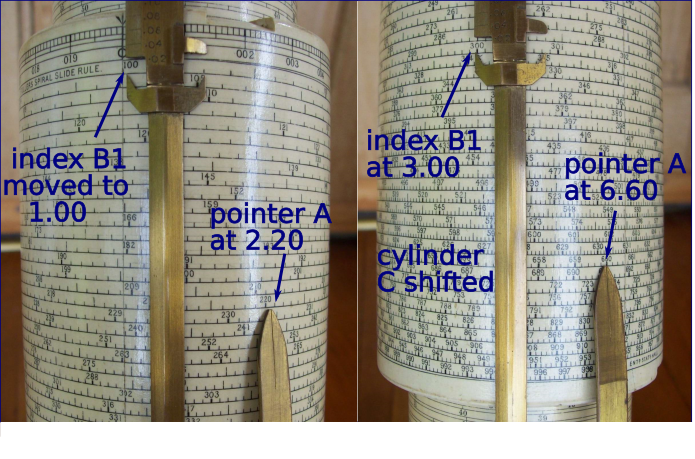
Multiplication procedure

The instrument operates on the principle that two pointers are set at an appropriate separation on the helical scale of the calculator. The relevant numbers are indexed by adjusting separately both the movable cylinder and the movable pointer. Since the scale is logarithmic the separation represents the ratio of the numbers. If the cylinder is then moved without altering the positions of the pointers, this same ratio applies between any other pair of numbers addressed. In other words, it is a logarithmic Gunter's scale wound into a helix with Gunter's compass points being provided by pointers A and B.

To multiply two numbers, p and q, cylinder C is rotated and shifted until pointer A points to p and pointer B is then moved so B1 points to 100. Next, cylinder C is moved so B1 points to q. (Note: Index mark B3 is used when B1 is off the scale. B1 and B3 are fixed on pointer B, with the distance between them equal to the distance between 100 and 1000 on the scale. Index marks B2 and B4 may be used if more convenient. B1 or B2 provide greater accuracy than B3 or B4.) The product is then read from the pointer A. The decimal point is determined as with an ordinary slide rule. At the end of a calculation, the slide rule is already positioned to continue with further multiplications (p × q × r ...).

To divide p by q, cylinder C is rotated and shifted until pointer A points to p, B1 is brought to q, cylinder C is moved to bring 100 to B1 and the quotient is read from pointer A. It turns out to be particularly efficient to alternate multiplication with division. After all, B1 points at 100 after a division, and this is also how multiplications start.

=== Determining logarithms ===
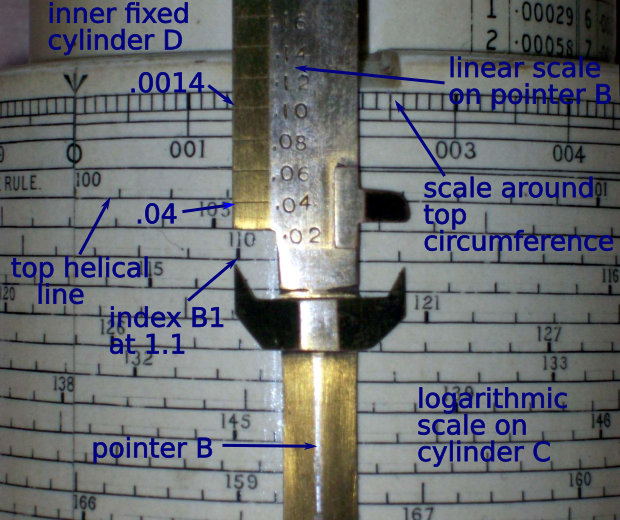
Detail of scales for log calculation ( log_{10}(1.1) = 0.04 + 0.0014 )

There are two other scales inscribed on the calculator which allow logarithms to be calculated and enabling such evaluations as p^{q} and $\sqrt[q]{p}$. The scales are linear and one is engraved along the length of pointer B and the other printed around the circumference of the top of cylinder C. Index B1 is set to the relevant value on cylinder C and then two readings are taken. The first reading is from the scale on pointer B where it crosses the topmost spiral of the helical scale on the cylinder. The second reading is from the scale at the top circumference of cylinder C where it crosses the left edge of pointer B. The sum of the readings provides the mantissa of the log of the value. (Note: For model 2 calculators there is a better way of using logs (see "trigonometry and log functions").)

=== Trigonometry and log functions ===
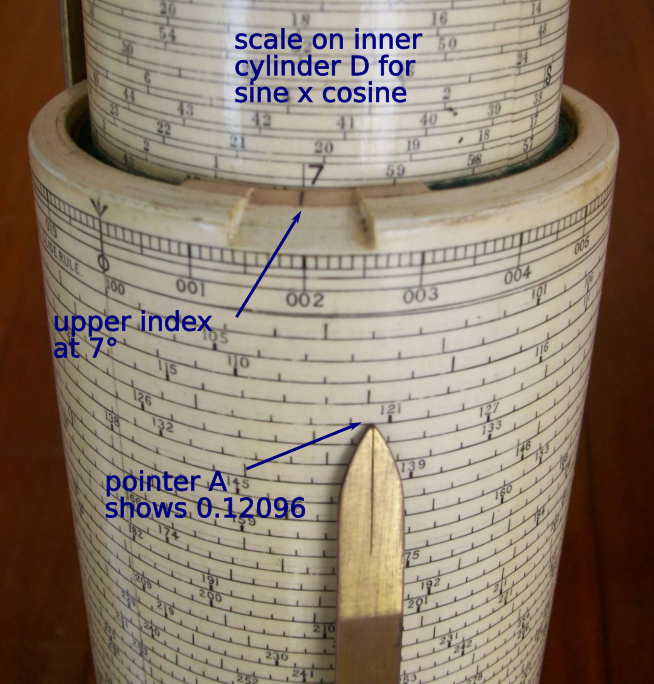
Model 3 Fuller-Bakewell use of sine.cosine

For model 2 instruments with scales on the inner cylinder D, there is an index mark inscribed on both the top and bottom edges of cylinder C. As an example of use, when the lower index mark is set to an angle printed on the lower scale on cylinder D, pointer A points to the corresponding value of sine on cylinder C. The same approach apples for the log scale on the upper part of cylinder D. (Note: The angle is in degrees. For logs, the argument is pointed to on cylinder C and the resulting logarithm to the base 10 is at the upper index point. Note that pointer A and cylinder D are in a fixed orientation because both are rigidly attached to the handle.) The model 3 Fuller–Bakewell is used in the same way but its scales on cylinder D are for cosine² and sine⋅cosine(see photograph).
