= PPC Journal =

Technology magazine (1974–1987)

PPC Journal was an early hobbyist computer magazine, originally targeted at users of HP's first programmable calculator, the HP-65. It originated as 65 Notes and the first issue was published in 1974. It later changed names in 1978 to PPC Journal and in 1980 to PPC Calculator Journal. With Volume 12 published in 1984 the magazine was renamed PPC Journal. The magazine ended publication in July 1987 (Volume 14).

The founder of the PPC (Personal Programming Center) and editor of the journal was Richard J. Nelson. This hobbyist group worked around the journal and was known because Nelson discovered hidden instructions on the HP-65 calculator. Later the club and the journal got maximum notoriety when several club members discovered the "synthetic instructions" of the HP-41C.

== Competition ==
A similar journal since 1976 was 52-Notes for the Texas Instruments SR-52 user community. It was edited by Richard C. Vanderburgh. Both journals deliberately established a mode of "friendly competition", often exchanging information and comparing solutions among user groups. This journal was later renamed into TI PPC Notes and edited by Maurice E. T. Swinnen (from January 1980 to December 1982) and Palmer O. Hanson, Jr. (from January 1983).
