= Hewlett-Packard 9100A =

Programmable calculator

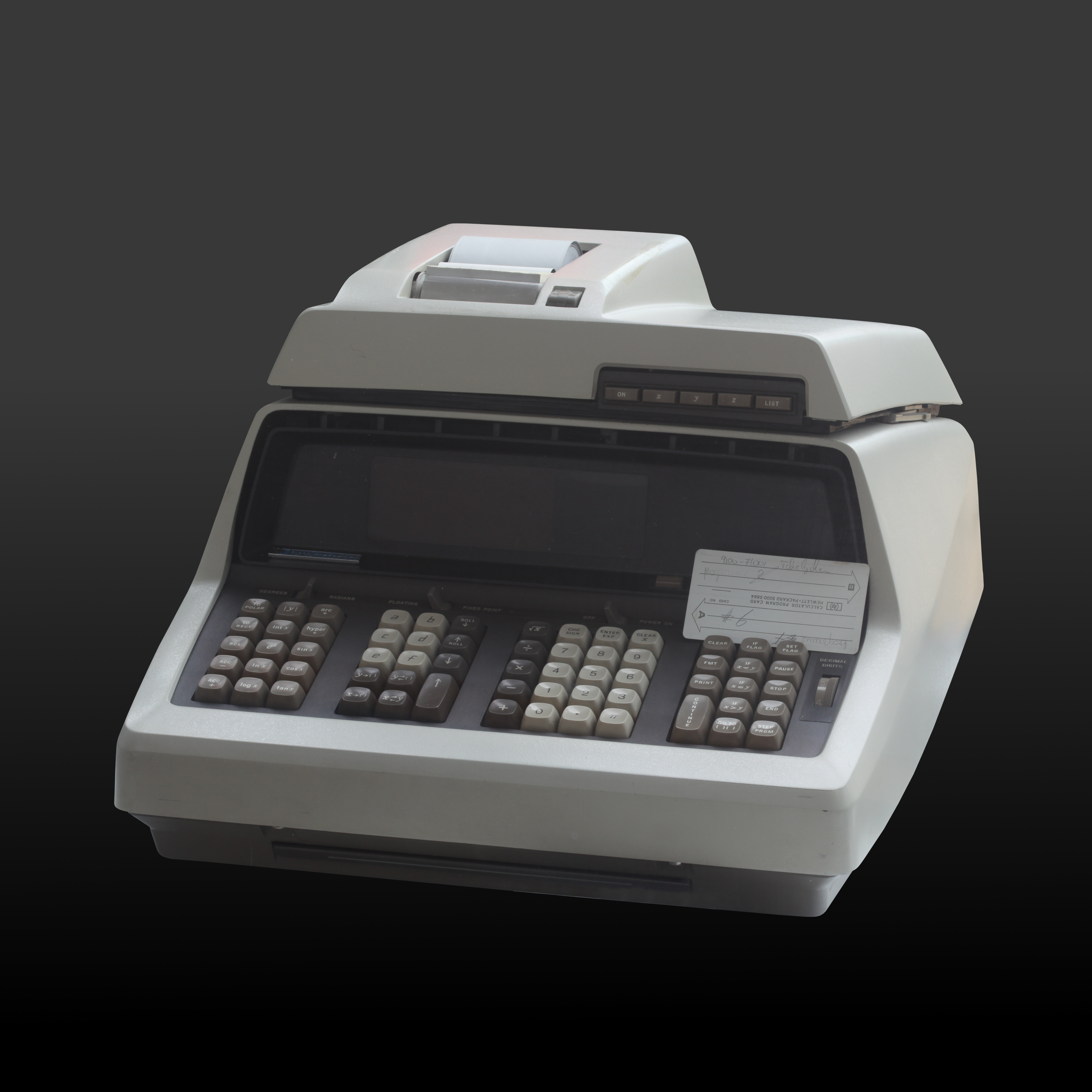
"The new Hewlett-Packard 9100A personal computer" is "ready, willing, and able... to relieve you of waiting to get on the big computer."

The Hewlett-Packard 9100A (HP 9100A) is an early programmable calculator (or computer), first appearing in 1968. HP called it a desktop calculator because, as Bill Hewlett said, "If we had called it a computer, it would have been rejected by our customers' computer gurus because it didn't look like an IBM. We therefore decided to call it a calculator, and all such nonsense disappeared."

An ad for the 9100A in 1968 Science magazine contains one of the earliest documented use (as of 2000) of the phrase personal computer.

== History ==
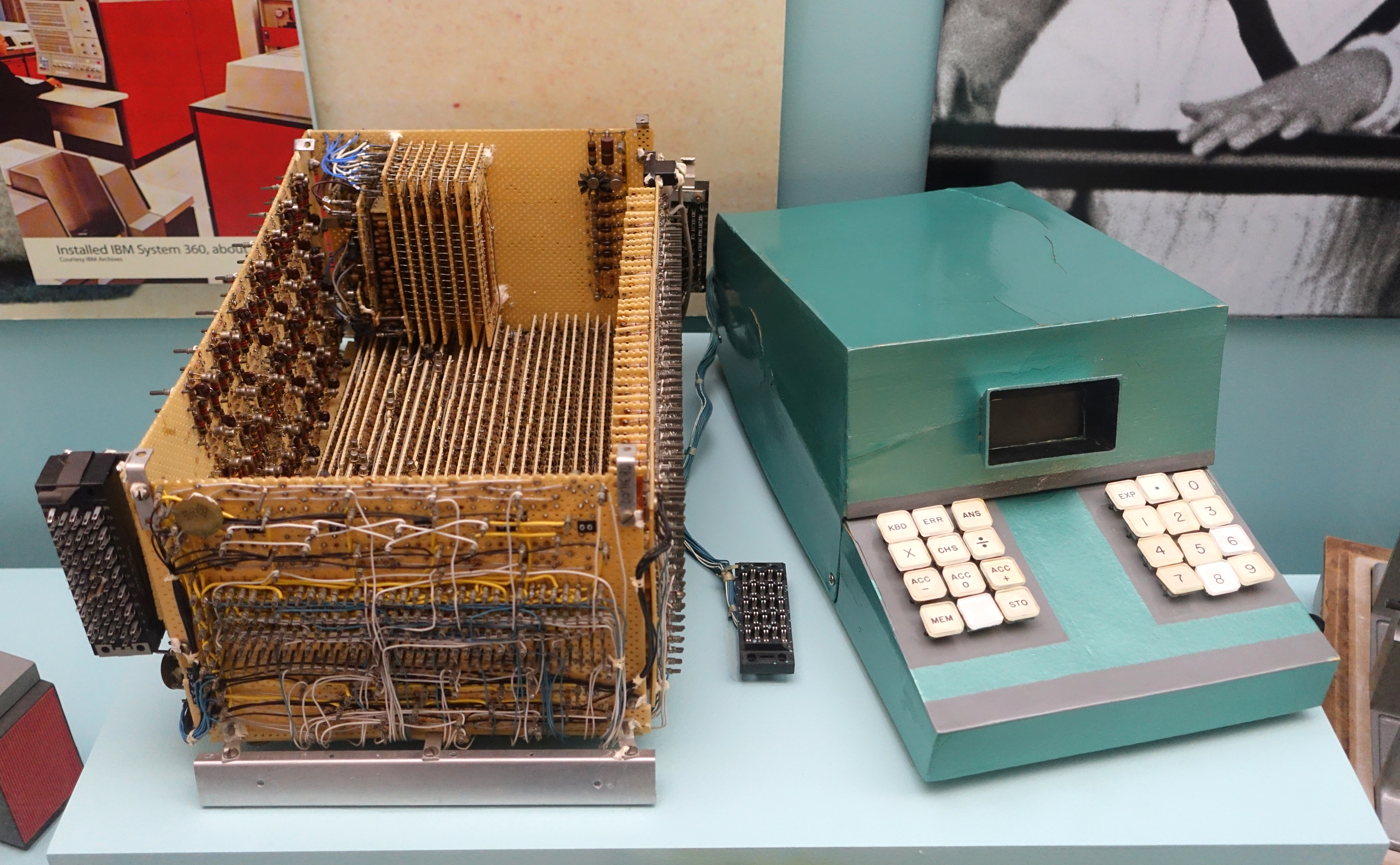
Electronic calculator prototype, made by Thomas E. Osborne for Hewlett-Packard, 1964, in the National Museum of American History

The device descended from a prototype designed by engineer Thomas "Tom" E. Osborne, who joined the company when HP adopted his idea.

An engineering triumph, the logic circuit was produced without any integrated circuits. The CPU was entirely executed using discrete components. With CRT readout, magnetic card storage, and printer, the price was around US$4,900 (equivalent to $45,000 in 2025).

Thanks to its high speed operation an order of magnitude faster than competitors – addition or subtraction took just 2 ms, multiplication 22 ms and division 27 ms – the device could quickly execute not just regular trigonometric functions (330 ms) or logarithms (130 ms) but many iterative computations when following a program. This made the 9100A the first scientific calculator by the modern definition, and also marked the beginning of Hewlett-Packard's long history of using Reverse Polish notation (RPN) entry on their calculators.

Due to the similarities of their machines, Hewlett-Packard was ordered to pay about $900,000 in royalties to Olivetti after copying some of the features adopted from the Programma 101, like the magnetic card and the architecture.

== See also ==
- HP-35
- CORDIC
