= HP-45 =

Scientific pocket calculator

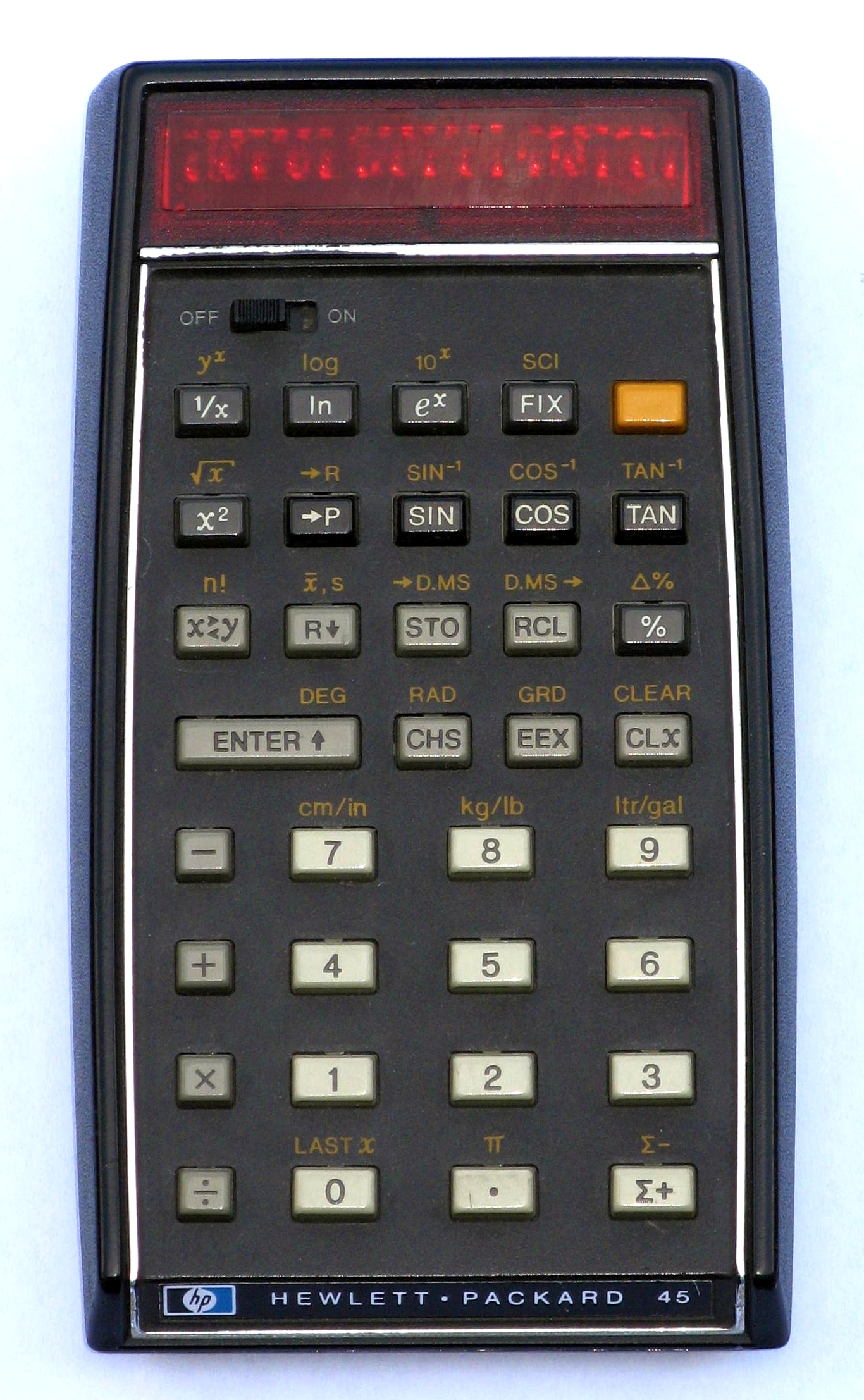
- HP-45; Advanced Scientific Electronic Pocket Calculator
- Type: Scientific
- Introduced: 1973
- Discontinued: 1976

Calculator
- Entry mode: RPN
- Display type: Red LED seven-segment display
- Display size: 15 digits (decimal point uses one digit), (±10^{±99})

Programming
- Programming language(s): RPN key stroke
- Memory register: Four-register operational stack with nine addressable memory registers + LASTx register

Other
- Power supply: Internal rechargeable battery or 115/230 V AC, 5 W
- Weight: Calculator: 9 oz (260 g), recharger: 5 oz (140 g)
- Dimensions: Length: 5.8 inches (150 mm), width: 3.2 inches (81 mm), height: 0.7–1.3 inches (18–33 mm)

The HP-45 is the second scientific pocket calculator introduced by Hewlett-Packard, adding to the features of the HP-35. It was introduced in 1973 with an MSRP of US$395 (equivalent to $2,865 in 2025). Especially noteworthy was its pioneering addition of a shift key that gave other keys alternate functions.

The calculator was code-named Wizard, which is the first known use of a code name for a calculator.
It also contained an Easter egg that allowed users to access a not-especially accurate stopwatch mode. An accurate version of the stopwatch mode was officially featured in the 1975 successor of the HP-45, the HP-55.

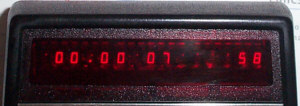
The display of the HP-45 hidden timer showing 00 hours 00 minutes 07 seconds and 58/100 second.

HP-45 functions
Arithmetic	+, −, ×, ÷
Trigonometry	sin, arc sin; cos, arc cos; tan, arc tan (decimal degrees, radians or grads).
Logarithms	log_{10}x, 10^{x}; log_{e}x, e^{x}
Conversions	Decimal degrees, radians or grads ↔ degrees–min.–sec. Rectangular coordinates ↔ polar coordinates. Conversion units: cm/in, kg/lb, ltr/gal
Other	1/x, √x, x^{2}, y^{x}, n!, %, Δ%, π, vector arithmetic, register arithmetic. Statistical accumulation with mean and standard deviation calculations. Fixed point and scientific display modes, 0 – 9 decimal places round-off.

== Emulators ==
Several individuals and companies make software emulators of the HP 45 series calculators.

Nonpareil, high-fidelity simulator for calculators
Emulates, among other, the HP-45. Licensed under the GNU General Public License (GPL). Available for Microsoft Windows.
HP-45 Emulator
HP-45 Emulator written in Java. Licensed under the GPL 3. Available for Android and Symbian.
HP-45 Windows Phone 7 App
An Emulator for Windows Phone 7.
HP-45 Emulator in JavaScript
The HP-45 Program ROM was translated to JavaScript to have an exact simulation of the original calculator for use in web browsers.
HP-45 Emulator in Python
Simulates the HP-45 and displays and explains its inner workings. For Linux, MacOS, Windows, CP/M, and more, with minimal mode for low-power machines.

== Patents ==
The complete design of the calculator and its firmware is patented under US 4001569A.
