= HP-35 =

First pocket scientific calculator

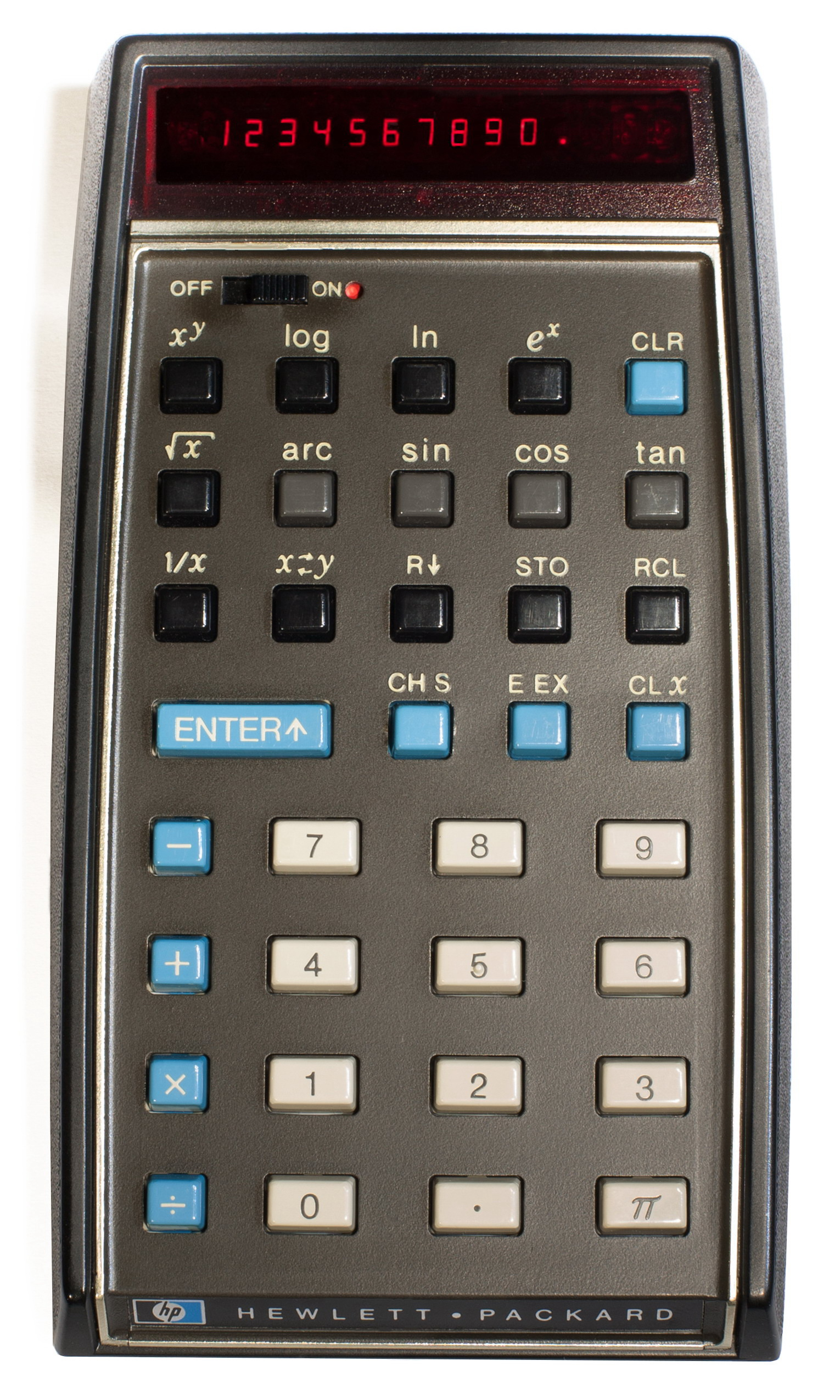
- HP-35 (1st version) scientific electronic pocket calculator
- Type: Scientific
- Introduced: 1972
- Discontinued: 1975

Calculator
- Entry mode: RPN
- Display type: Red LED seven-segment display
- Display size: 15 digits (decimal point uses one digit), (±10^{±99})

Programming
- Firmware memory: 768 bytes x 10 bits
- Memory register: Four-register operational stack with one memory register.

Other
- Power supply: Internal rechargeable three cell battery or 115/230 V AC, 5 W
- Weight: Calculator: 9 oz (260 g), recharger: 5 oz (140 g)
- Dimensions: Length: 5.8 inches (150 mm), width: 3.2 inches (81 mm), height: 0.7–1.3 inches (18–33 mm)

The HP-35 was Hewlett-Packard's first pocket calculator and the world's first scientific pocket calculator: a calculator with trigonometric and exponential functions. It was introduced in 1972.

== History ==
In about 1970 HP co-founder Bill Hewlett challenged France Rode to create a "shirt-pocket sized HP-9100". At the time, slide rules were the only practical portable devices for performing trigonometric and exponential functions, as existing pocket calculators could only perform addition, subtraction, multiplication, and division. Introduced at US$395 (equivalent to $3,000 in 2024), like HP's first scientific calculator, the desktop 9100A, it used reverse Polish notation (RPN) rather than what came to be called "algebraic" entry. The "35" in the calculator's name came from the number of keys.

The original HP-35 was available from 1972 to 1975. In 2007 HP announced the release of the "retro"-look HP 35s to commemorate the 35th anniversary of the launch of the original HP-35. It was priced at US$59.99.

The HP-35 was named an IEEE Milestone in 2009.

== Description ==
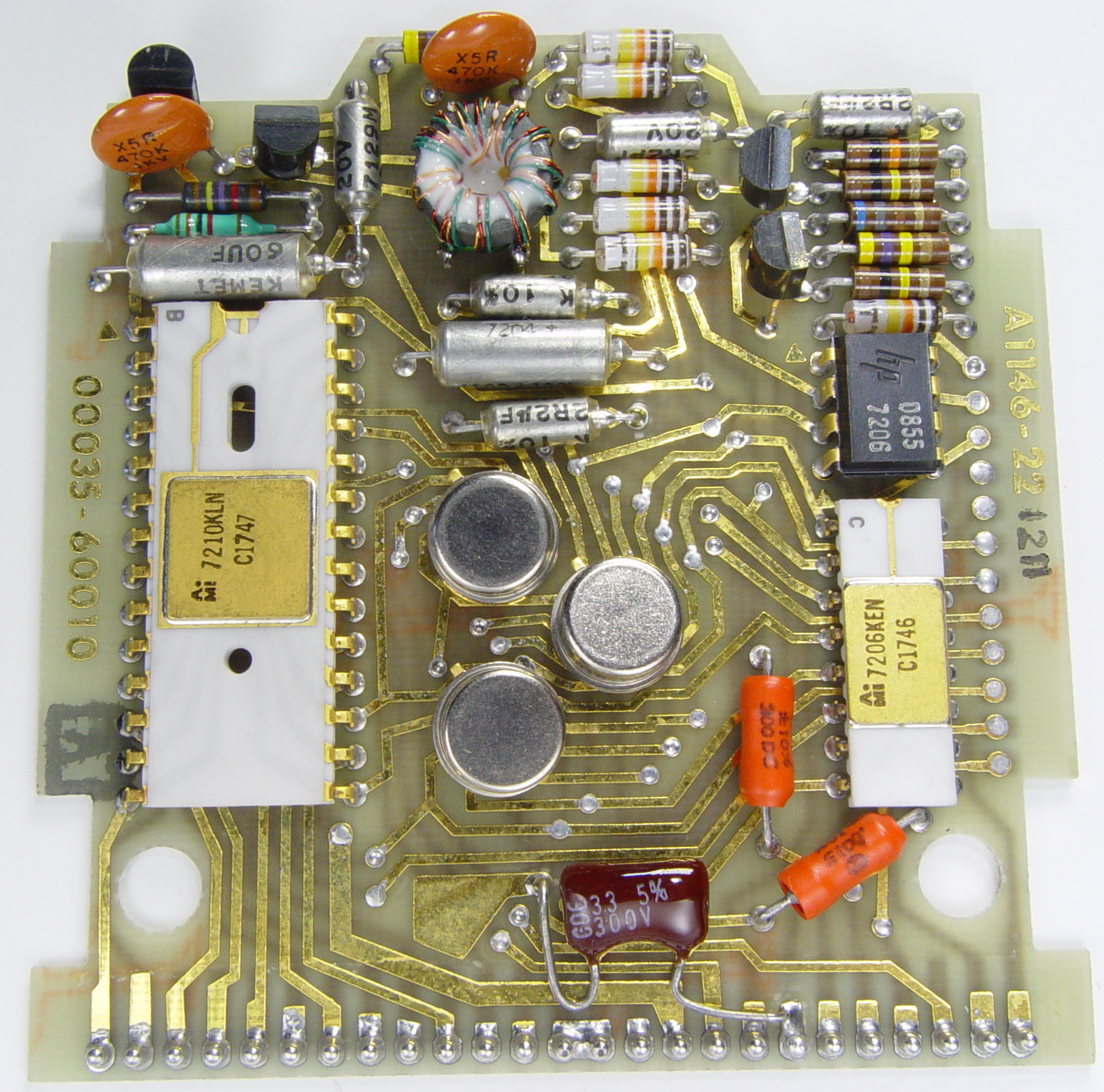
HP-35 mainboard

The calculator used a traditional floating decimal display for numbers that could be displayed in that format, but automatically switched to scientific notation for other numbers. The fifteen-digit LED display was capable of displaying a ten-digit mantissa plus its sign and a decimal point and a two-digit exponent plus its sign. The display used a unique form of multiplexing, illuminating a single LED segment at a time rather than a single LED digit, because HP research had shown that this method was perceived by the human eye as brighter for equivalent power. Light-emitting diodes were relatively new at the time and were much dimmer than high-efficiency diodes developed in subsequent decades.

The calculator used three "AA"-sized NiCd batteries assembled into a removable proprietary battery pack. Replacement battery packs are no longer available, leaving existing HP-35 calculators to rely on AC power, or their users to rebuild the battery packs themselves using available cells. An external battery charger was available, and the calculator could also run from the charger, with or without batteries installed.

Internally, the calculator was organized around a serial (1-bit) processor chipset dual sourced under contract from Mostek and American Microsystems, Inc. (pictured), processing Decimal floating point numbers with 10 digit mantissa and 2 digit exponent, stored in 14 nibbles (56 bit) numbers as BCD including two nibbles for the signs.

HP-35 functions
Arithmetic	+, −, ×, ÷
Trigonometry	sin, arc sin; cos, arc cos; tan, arc tan (decimal degrees)
Logarithms	log_{10} x; log_{e} x, e^{x}
Other	1/x, √x, x^{y}, π

The calculator had a four-register stack (x, y, z and t). The stack was represented in the operating manuals with the t register at the top, followed by the registers z, y, and x. The "enter" key pushed the displayed value (x) up the stack. Any binary operation popped the bottom two registers and pushed the result. When the stack was popped, the t register duplicated into the z register. The ‚roll down‘ operation treated the stack like a ring buffer by ‚rolling down‘ the register contents from t to z, z to y, y to x, and x to t.

== Descendants ==
The HP-35 was the start of a family of related calculators with similar mechanical packaging:

- The HP-45 added many more features, including the ability to control the output format (rather than the purely automatic format of the HP-35). It also contained an undocumented timer feature. The timer worked, but was not accurate enough to use as a stopwatch due to lack of a crystal oscillator.
- The HP-65 added programmability, with program storage on magnetic cards.
- The HP-55, a less expensive follow-on to the HP-65, provided storage for smaller programs, but didn't provide any external storage. The timer that was already present on the HP-45 was now crystal-controlled to achieve the needed accuracy and explicitly documented.
- The HP-67 expanded on the programmability of the HP-65, and added fully merged keycodes.
- The HP-80 and cheaper HP-70 provided financial, rather than scientific functions, such as future value and net present value.

Follow-on calculators used varying mechanical packaging but most were operationally similar. The HP-25 was a smaller, cheaper model of a programmable scientific calculator without magnetic card reader, with features much like the HP-65. The HP-41C was a major advance in programmability and capacity, and offered CMOS memory so that programs were not lost when the calculator was switched off. It was the first calculator to offer alphanumeric capabilities for both the display and the keyboard. Four external ports below the display area allowed memory expansion (RAM modules), loading of additional programs (ROM modules) and interfacing a wide variety of peripherals including HP-IL ("HP Interface Loop"), a scaled-down version of the HPIB/GPIB/IEEE-488 instrument bus. The later HP-28C and HP-28S added much more memory and a substantially different, more powerful programming metaphor.

== Calculator trivia ==
- The HP-35 was 5.8 inches (150 mm) long and 3.2 inches (81 mm) wide, said to have been designed to fit into one of William Hewlett's shirt pockets.
- Was the first scientific calculator to fly in space in 1973.
- HP-35 calculators were carried on the Skylab 3 and Skylab 4 flights, between July 1973 and February 1974.
- Is the first pocket calculator with a numeric range that covered 200 decades (more precise 199, ±10^{±99}).
- The LED display power requirement was responsible for the HP-35's short battery life between charges—about three hours. To extend operating time and avoid wearing out the on/off slide switch, users would press the decimal point key to force the display to illuminate just a single LED junction.
- The HP-35 calculated arithmetic, logarithmic, and trigonometric functions but the complete implementation used only 767 carefully chosen instructions (7670 bits).
- One high-quality feature of the HP-35 was its use of double-injected keys. Rather than printing the function on the key surface where it could wear off over time and use as with cheaper calculators, the keys were constructed with two colors of plastic, providing durable key top labels for the labeled keys.
- Introduction of the HP-35 and similar scientific calculators by Texas Instruments soon thereafter signaled the demise of the slide rule among science and engineering students. Slide rule holsters rapidly gave way to "electronic slide rule" holsters, and colleges began to drop slide-rule classes from their curricula.
- 100,000 HP-35 calculators were sold in the first year, and over 300,000 by the time it was discontinued in 1975—3½ years after its introduction.

== See also ==
- CORDIC
- France Rode
- Sinclair Scientific
