= HP-65 =

Programmable handheld calculator with magnetic card reader

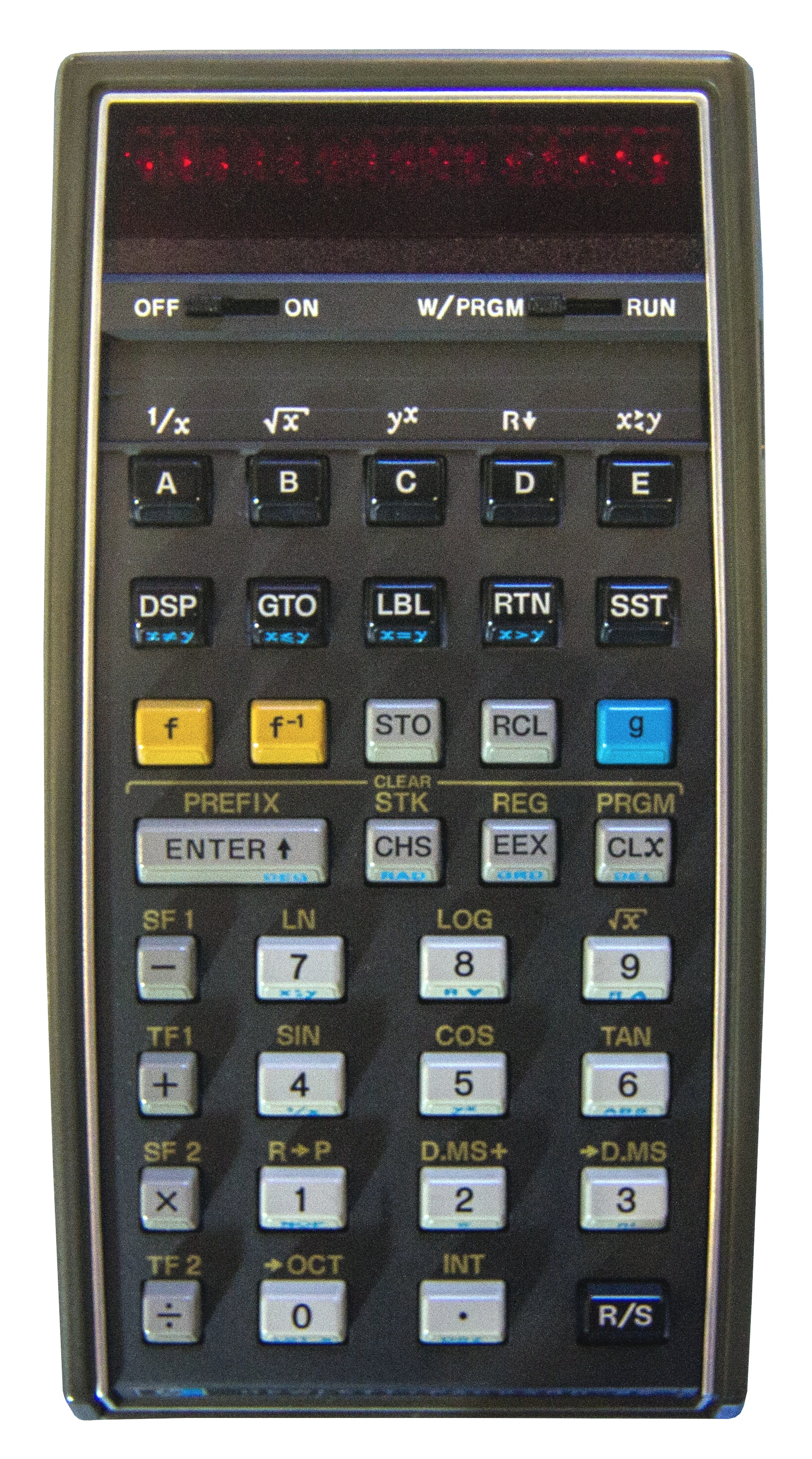
- HP-65 keyboard and display
- Type: Programmable
- Introduced: January 1974

Calculator
- Entry mode: RPN key stroke
- Display type: Red LED seven-segment display
- Display size: 15 digits (decimal point uses one digit), (±10^{±99})

CPU
- Processor: Proprietary

Programming
- Programming language(s): Key codes
- Memory register: 8 (9) plus 4-level working stack
- Program steps: 100

Other
- Power supply: Internal rechargeable battery or 115/230 V AC, 5 W
- Weight: Calculator: 11 oz (310 g), recharger: 5 oz (140 g)
- Dimensions: Length: 6.0 inches (150 mm), width: 3.2 inches (81 mm), height: 0.7–1.4 inches (18–36 mm)

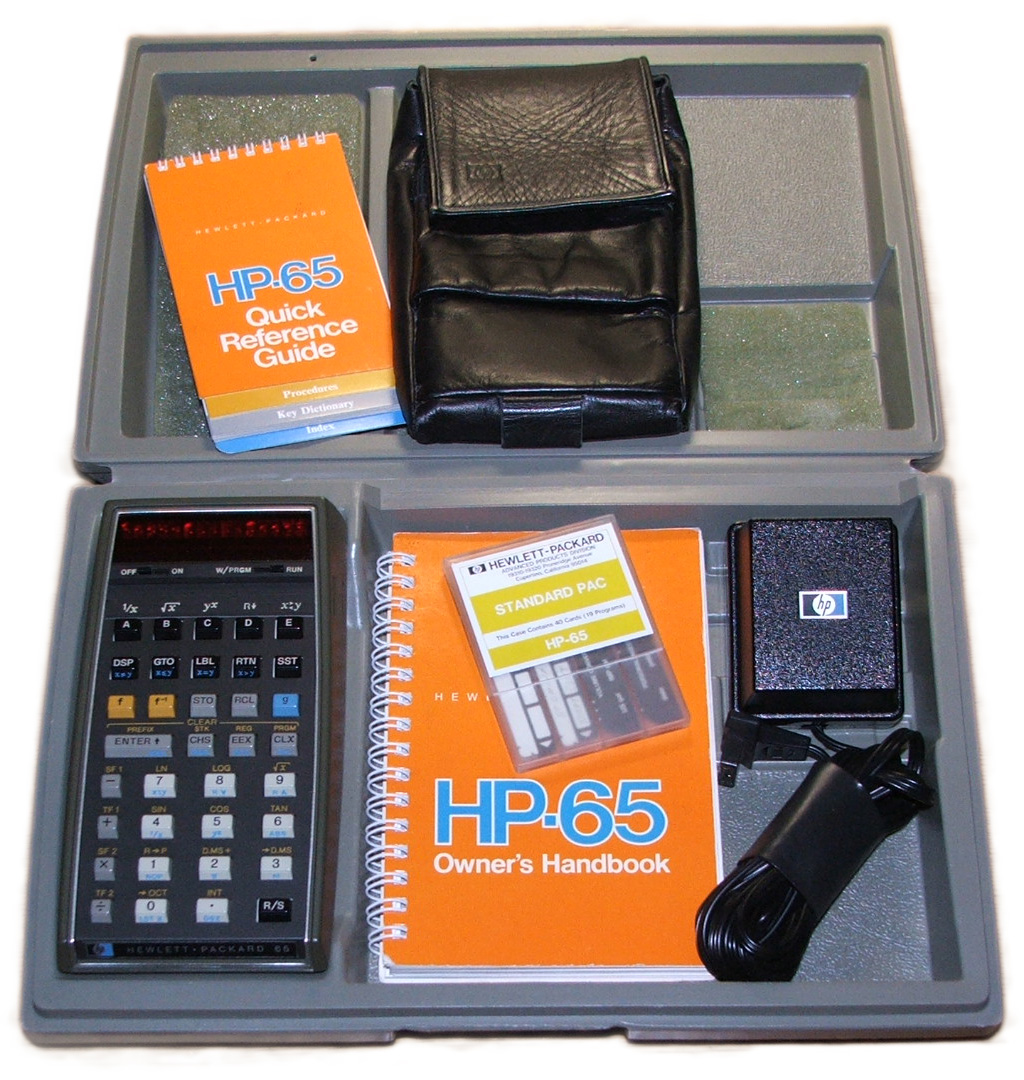
HP-65 in original hard case with manuals, software "Standard Pac" of magnetic cards, soft leather case, and charger

The HP-65 is the first handheld programmable calculator, and it included a magnetic card read/write system for program storage. Introduced by Hewlett-Packard in January 1974 at an MSRP of $795 (equivalent to $5,190 in 2025), it featured nine storage registers and room for 100 keystroke instructions. It also included a magnetic card reader/writer to save and load programs. Like all Hewlett-Packard calculators of the era and most since, the HP-65 used reverse Polish notation (RPN) and a four-level automatic operand stack.

Bill Hewlett's design requirement was that the calculator should fit in his shirt pocket. That is one reason for the tapered depth of the calculator. The magnetic program cards are fed in at the thick end of the calculator under the LED display. The documentation for the programs in the calculator is extensive, including algorithms for hundreds of applications, including the solutions of differential equations, stock price estimation, statistics, and so forth.

== Features ==
The HP-65 introduced the "tall", trapezoid-shaped keys that would become iconic for many generations of HP calculators. Each of the keys had up to four functions. In addition to the "normal function" printed on the key's face, a "gold" function printed on the case above the key and a "blue" function printed on the slanted front surface of the key were accessed by pushing the gold f or blue g prefix key, respectively. For example, f followed by 4 would access the sine function, or g followed by 4 would calculate $1/x$. For some mathematical functions, a gold f^{−1} prefix key would access the inverse of the gold-printed functions, e.g. f^{−1} followed by 4 would calculate the inverse sine ($\sin^{-1}$).

Functions included square root, inverse, trigonometric (sine, cosine, tangent and their inverses), exponentiation, logarithms and factorial. The HP-65 was one of the first calculators to include a base conversion function, although it only supported octal (base 8) conversion. It could also perform conversions between degrees/minutes/seconds (sexagesimal) and decimal degree (sexadecimal) values, as well as polar/cartesian coordinate conversion.

== Programming ==
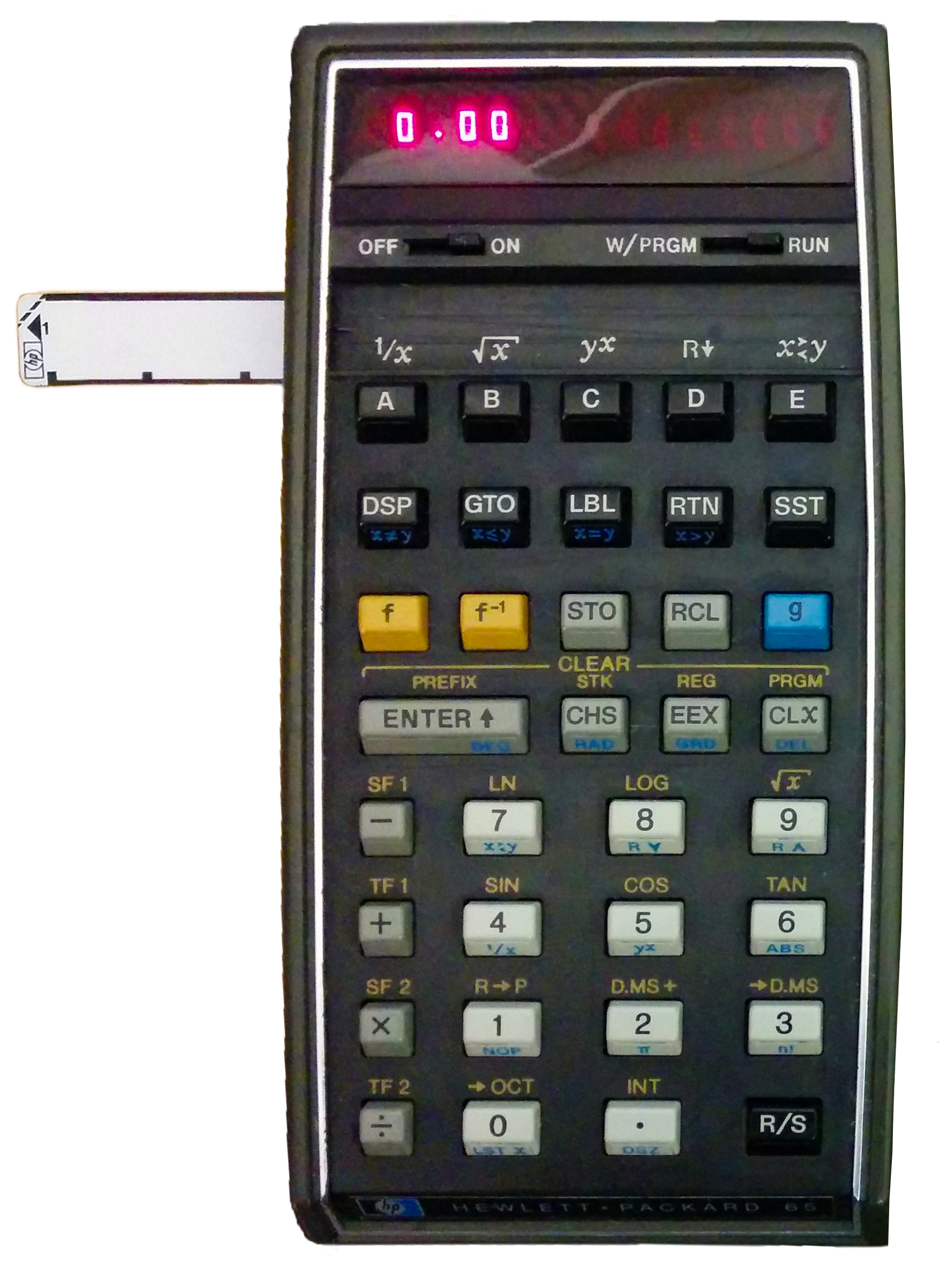
Calculator with a magnetic storage card in the slit of the card reader on the side of the device

The HP-65 had a program memory for up to 100 instructions of six bits which included subroutine calls and conditional branching based on comparison of x and y registers. Some (but not all) commands entered as multiple keystrokes were stored in a single program memory cell. When displaying a program, the key codes were shown without line numbers.

A program could be saved to mylar-based magnetically coated cards measuring 71 mm × 9.5 mm (2.8 in × 0.4 in), which were fed through the reader by a small electric motor through a worm gear and rubber roller at a speed of 6 cm/s (2.4 in/s). The recording area used only half of the width of the card. While reversing the card to store a second program was possible, it was officially discouraged (unlike in later models such as the HP-67) because the other half of the card was touched by the rubber wheel during transport, causing extra abrasion. When inserted into an extra slot between the display and the keyboard, the printing on top of the card would correspond to the top row of keys (A - E), which served as shortcuts to the corresponding program entry points.

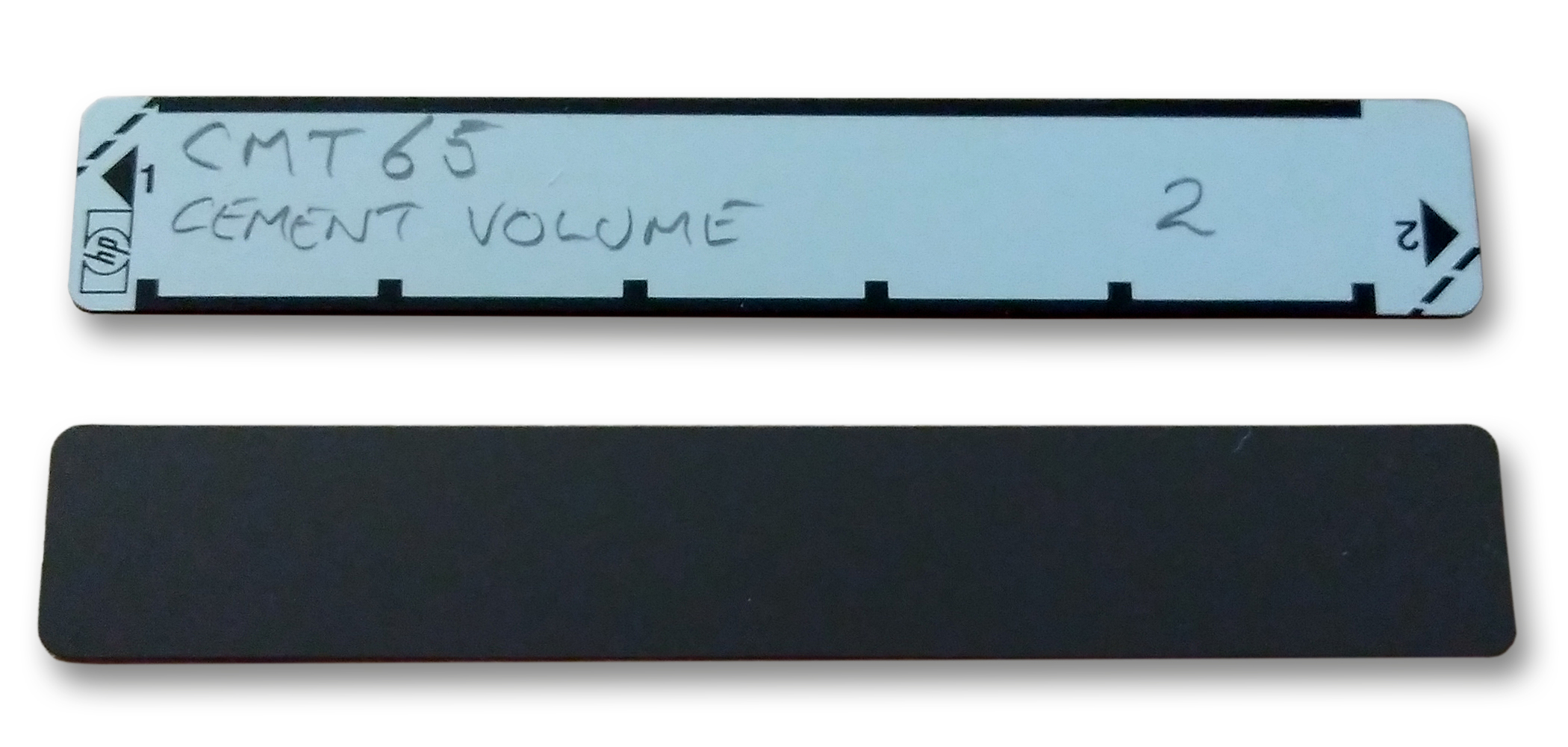
HP magnetic card

Cards could be write-protected by diagonally clipping the top-left corner of the card. HP also sold a number of program collections for scientific and engineering applications on sets of prerecorded (and write-protected) cards.

The HP-65 had an issue/design flaw whereby storage register R9 was corrupted whenever the user (or program) executed trigonometric functions or performed comparison tests; this kind of issue was common in many early calculators, caused by a lack of memory due to cost, power, or size considerations. Since the limitation was intended from the beginning and documented in the manual, it is not, strictly speaking, a bug.

== Significant applications ==
During the 1975 Apollo–Soyuz Test Project, the HP-65 became the first programmable handheld calculator in outer space. Two HP-65s were carried on board the Apollo spacecraft. Calculation of parameters for the several thrusting maneuvers needed to rendezvous with the Soyuz spacecraft was done on the HP-65 and compared with the results calculated by the onboard Apollo Guidance Computer. Another program for the HP-65 allowed the crew to compute pointing angles for the spacecraft antenna for aiming at the ATS-6 communications relay satellite.

In the same year, Mitchell Feigenbaum, using the small HP-65 calculator he had been issued at the Los Alamos National Laboratory, discovered that the ratio of the difference between the values at which successive period-doubling bifurcations occur tends to a constant of around 4.6692... This "ratio of convergence" became known as the first Feigenbaum constant.

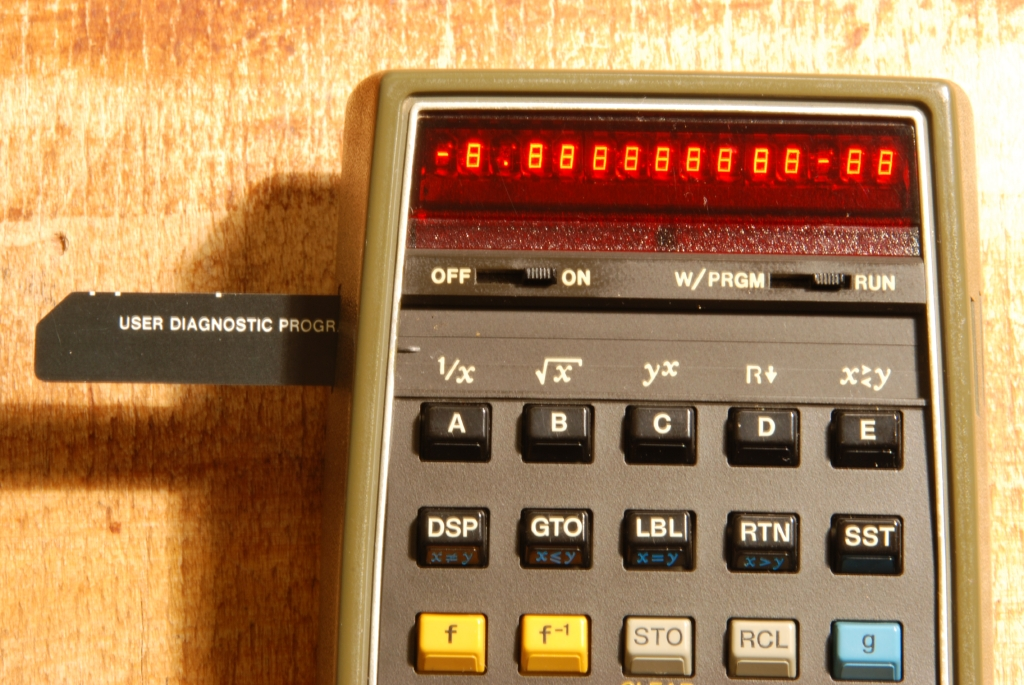
HP-65 display after result of test program from card reader

== See also ==
- HP-25
- HP-35
- 65 Notes
