= Casio fx-3900Pv =

Programmable scientific calculator produced by Casio

CASIO fx-3900Pv
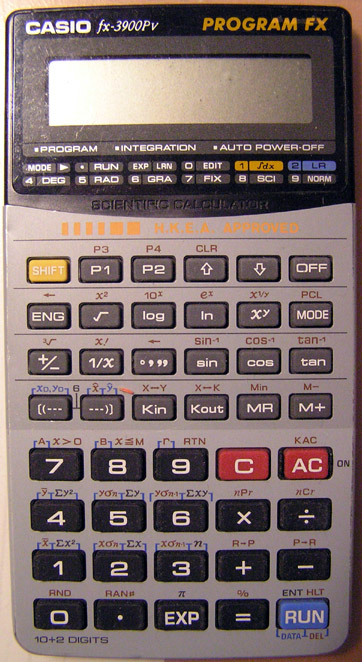
- Type: Programmable
- Manufacturer: Casio
- Introduced: 1992

Calculator
- Entry mode: Infix
- Display type: LCD Dot-matrix

Programming
- Programming language(s): Keystroke
- Program steps: 300

Other
- Power supply: CR2025
- Weight: 65 grams
- Dimensions: 8.2 mm H x 74 mm W x 141 mm D

The Casio fx-3900Pv is a programmable scientific calculator with 300 steps. Introduced in 1992, its production has since stopped with the introduction of fx-3650P and fx-3950P.
