= HP 33s =

Scientific calculator by Hewlett-Packard

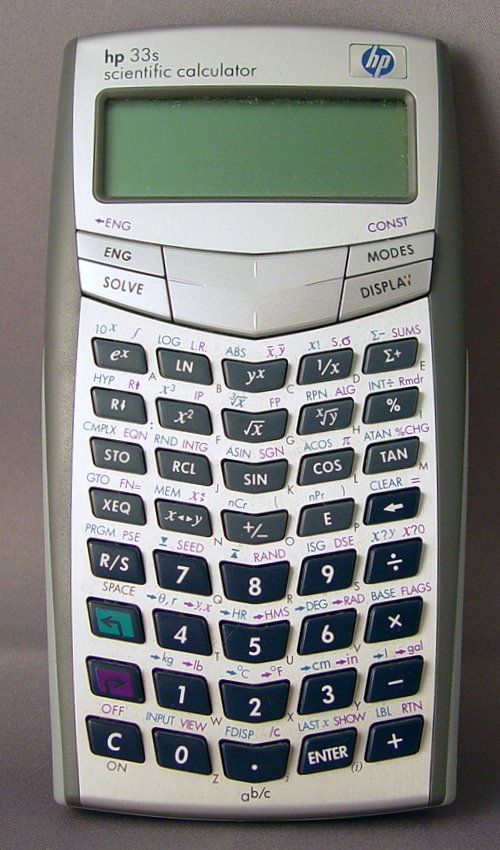
- Front view of the HP 33s
- Type: Programmable Scientific
- Manufacturer: Hewlett-Packard
- Introduced: 2003
- Design firm: Kinpo Electronics
- Cost: 40 USD

Calculator
- Entry mode: RPN, Infix
- Precision: 15 digits ±499 exponent (internal)
- Display type: LCD dot-matrix
- Display size: 2×14 character

CPU
- Processor: 6502

Programming
- Programming language(s): RPN keystroke (fully merged, Turing complete)
- User memory: 31 KB
- Memory register: 4 stack registers, 1 LastX register, 6 statistics registers, 27 variables (A..Z, i)

Other
- Power supply: 2× CR2032 batteries
- Weight: 119 g
- Dimensions: 158 × 83 × 16 mm

The HP 33s (F2216A) was a scientific calculator marketed by Hewlett-Packard. It was introduced in 2003 as the successor to the HP 32SII, and discontinued on the introduction of its successor, the HP 35s in 2007.

== Features ==
Its main features are:

- RPN or traditional semi-algebraic (infix data/algebraic operator entry/postfix one-number function entry), user-selectable
- Two-line LCD
- Full scientific/engineering mathematical features
- Keystroke-programmable with full boolean and program-control command sets and line edit, insert and delete
- HP "equation list" equation editor (fully algebraic) in both the stand-alone list as well as in keystroke programs
- HP Solver feature (solves equations and functions for one unknown)
- Function integration feature
- All mathematical operations and features fully functional in all modes
- Unit conversion and constants
- 31 KB of random-access user memory (equivalent to about 7 KB on earlier HP programmable models)

The main differences from the HP 32SII are:

- A radical difference in keypad layout and appearance
- Memory is expanded from 2 KB to 32 KB
- Faster processor
- More functions
- Algebraic entry mode as well as RPN
- The display has two lines
- The length of an equation was now restricted to 255 characters (no arbitrary limit in the 32SII)

The HP 33s was co-designed and manufactured by Kinpo Electronics of Taiwan.

== Reception ==
The HP 33s is generally considered to have fewer logic bugs than the HP 35s. However, the unconventional chevron-styled keypad has been regarded by reviewers as bizarre and difficult to use compared to other HP professional calculators.

== Revisions ==
The 33s went through numerous revisions that have solved two of the most pervasive issues people had with the early models (namely poor screen quality and bad keypad responsiveness).

== See also ==
- List of Hewlett-Packard products: Pocket calculators
- HP calculators
