= Quanta Computer =

Taiwan-based manufacturer of notebook computers and other electronic hardware

Quanta Computer, Inc.
- Type: Public
- Traded as: TWSE: 2382
- Industry: Computer hardware Electronics
- Founded: 1988; 38 years ago
- Headquarters: Taoyuan City, Taiwan 25°2′59.8″N 121°22′30.8″E
- Key people: Barry Lam, founder and chairman
- Products: Notebooks, Smartphones, Servers, Digital televisions, and others
- Revenue: ▲NT$2.12 trillion (2025) (US$68.14 billion)
- Operating income: ▲NT$91.56 billion (2025) (US$2.94 billion)
- Net income: ▲NT$69.43 billion (2025) (US$2.23 billion)
- Total assets: ▲NT$812.38 billion (2025) (US$26.07 billion)
- Total equity: ▲NT$225.1 billion (2025) (US$7.22 billion)
- Number of employees: ▲87,415 (2025)
- Website: www.quantatw.com

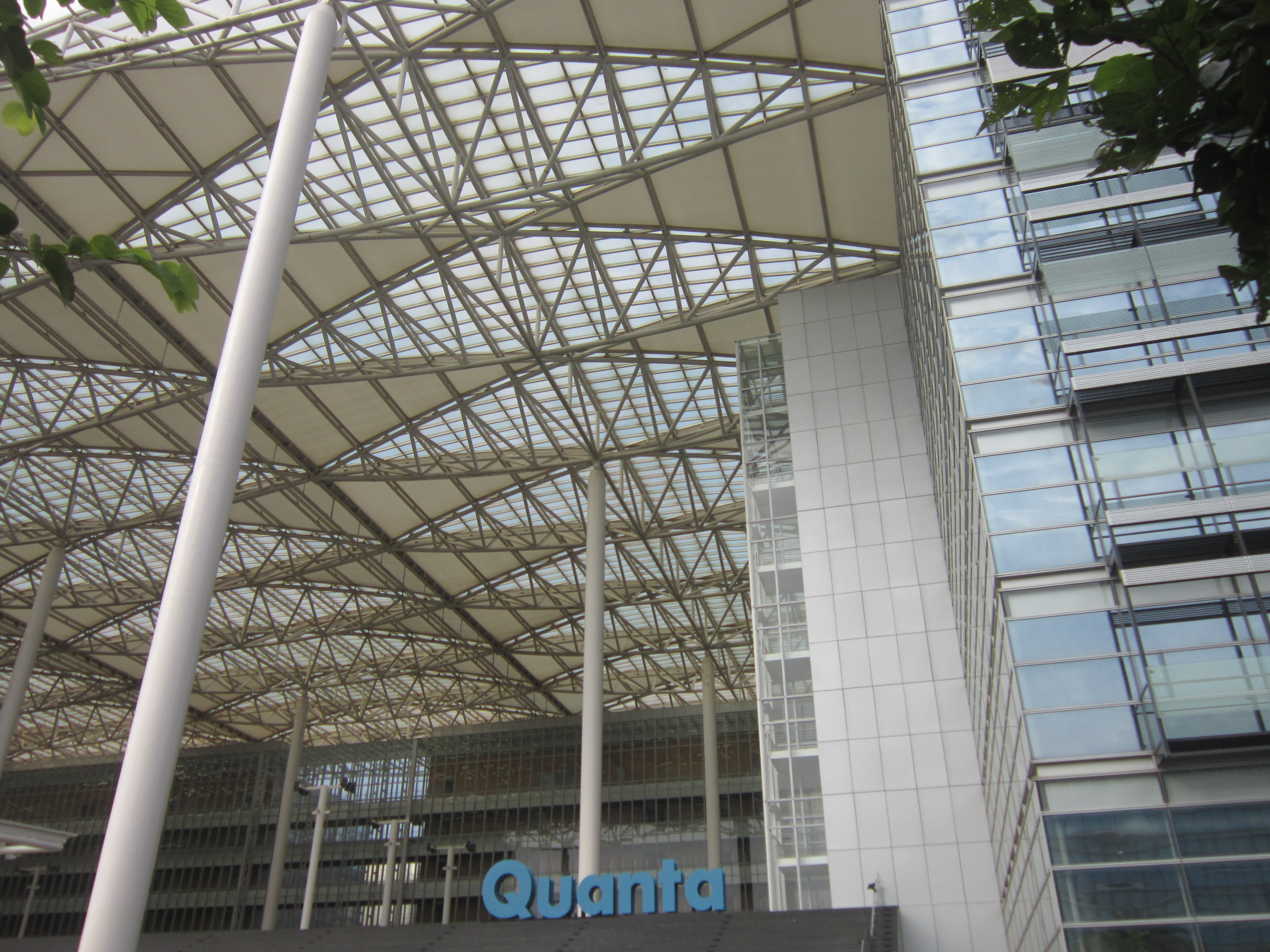
Quanta Computer Building Gate in Hwa Ya Technology Park

Quanta Computer Incorporated (Chinese: 廣達電腦; pinyin: Guǎngdá Diànnǎo) is a Taiwanese contract manufacturer of electronic hardware.

Quanta's business extends to enterprise network systems, home entertainment, mobile communication, automotive electronics, and digital home markets. The company also designs, manufactures and markets GPS systems, including handheld GPS, in-car GPS, Bluetooth GPS and GPS with other positioning technologies.

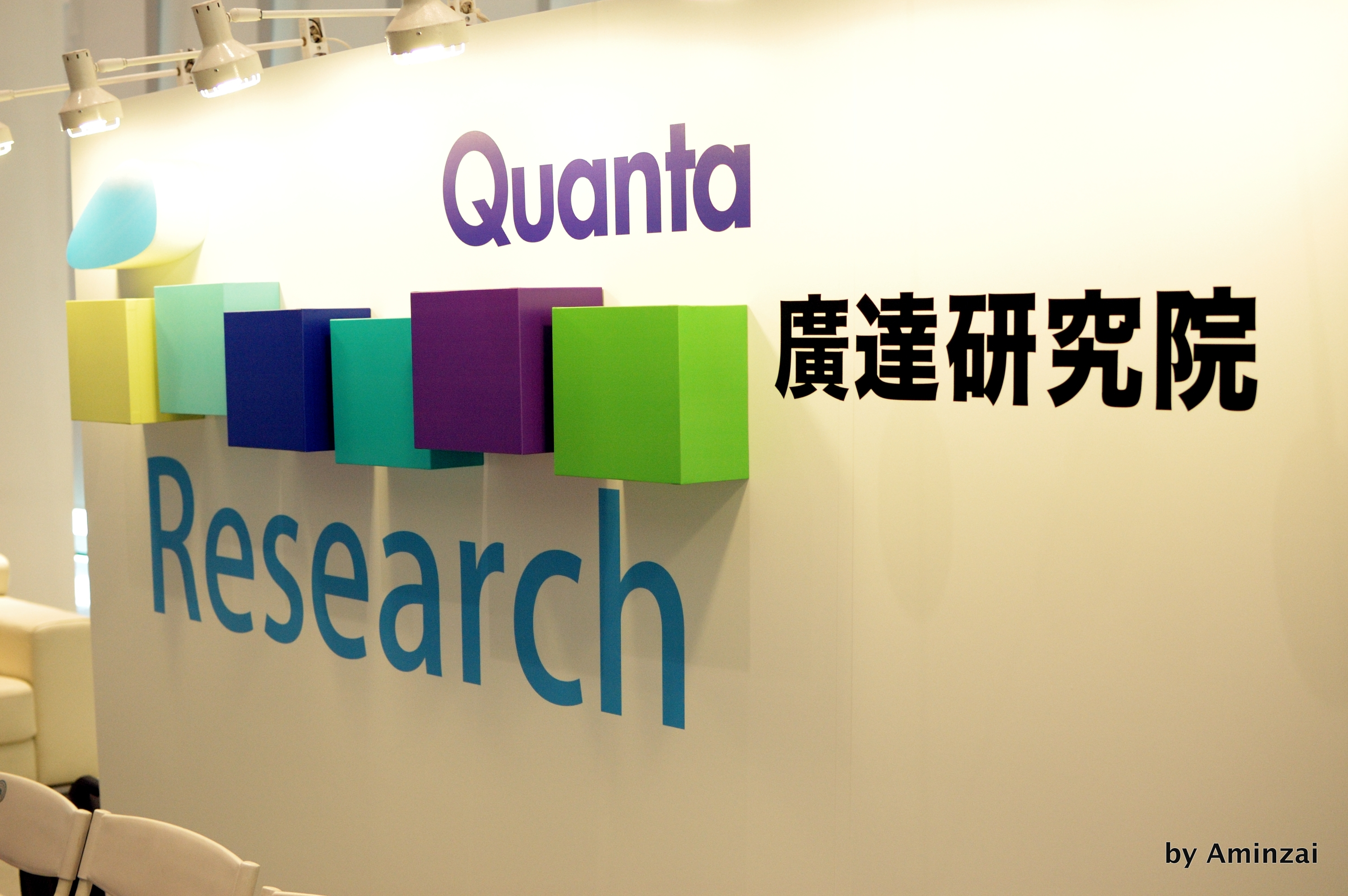
Quanta Research title at COSCUP

Quanta Computer was announced as the original design manufacturer (ODM) for the XO-1 by the One Laptop per Child project on December 13, 2005, and took an order for one million laptops as of February 16, 2007. In October 2008, it was announced that Acer would phase out Quanta from the production chain, and instead outsource manufacturing of 15 million Aspire One netbooks to Compal Electronics.

In 2011, Quanta designed servers in conjunction with Facebook as part of the Open Compute Project.

It was estimated that notebook computers Quanta had manufactured held a 31% worldwide market share in the first quarter of 2008.

== History ==
The firm was founded in 1988 by Barry Lam, a Shanghai-born businessman who grew up in Hong Kong and received his education in Taiwan, with a starting capital of less than $900,000. A first notebook prototype was completed in November 1988, with factory production beginning in 1990.

Throughout the 1990s, Quanta established contracts with Apple and Gateway, opening an after-sales office in California in 1991 and another in Augsburg, Germany in 1994. In 1996, Quanta signed a contract with Dell, making the firm Quanta's largest customer at the time.

In 2014, Quanta ranked 409th on Fortune's Global 500 list. 2016 is the strongest period with it being in 326. In 2020, Quanta dropped to rank 377.

== Manufactured products ==
=== Apple ===
- PowerBook 1400
- iMac
- iPod video
- Apple Watch
- MacBook Air
- MacBook Pro

=== Other ===
- Steam Deck
- ThinkPad Z60m

== Subsidiaries ==
Subsidiaries of Quanta Computer include:

- Quanta Cloud Technology Inc - provider of data center hardware.
- FaceVsion Technology Inc - telecommunications, webcam, and electronic products.
- CloudCast Technology Inc - information software and data processing - liquidated in February 2017.
- TWDT Precision Co., Ltd. (TWDT) - 55% ownership, which was sold in June 2016.
- RoyalTek International - In January 2006, RoyalTek became a member of Quanta Inc. This allows Quanta to create a top-down integration of technology and manufacturing, and we now have manufacturing factories in Taiwan and Shanghai.

=== Techman Robot Inc. ===
Techman Robot Inc. is a cobot manufacturer founded by Quanta in 2016. It is based in Taoyuan's Hwa Ya Technology Park. It is the world's second-largest manufacturer of robots after Universal Robots.

== Facilities ==
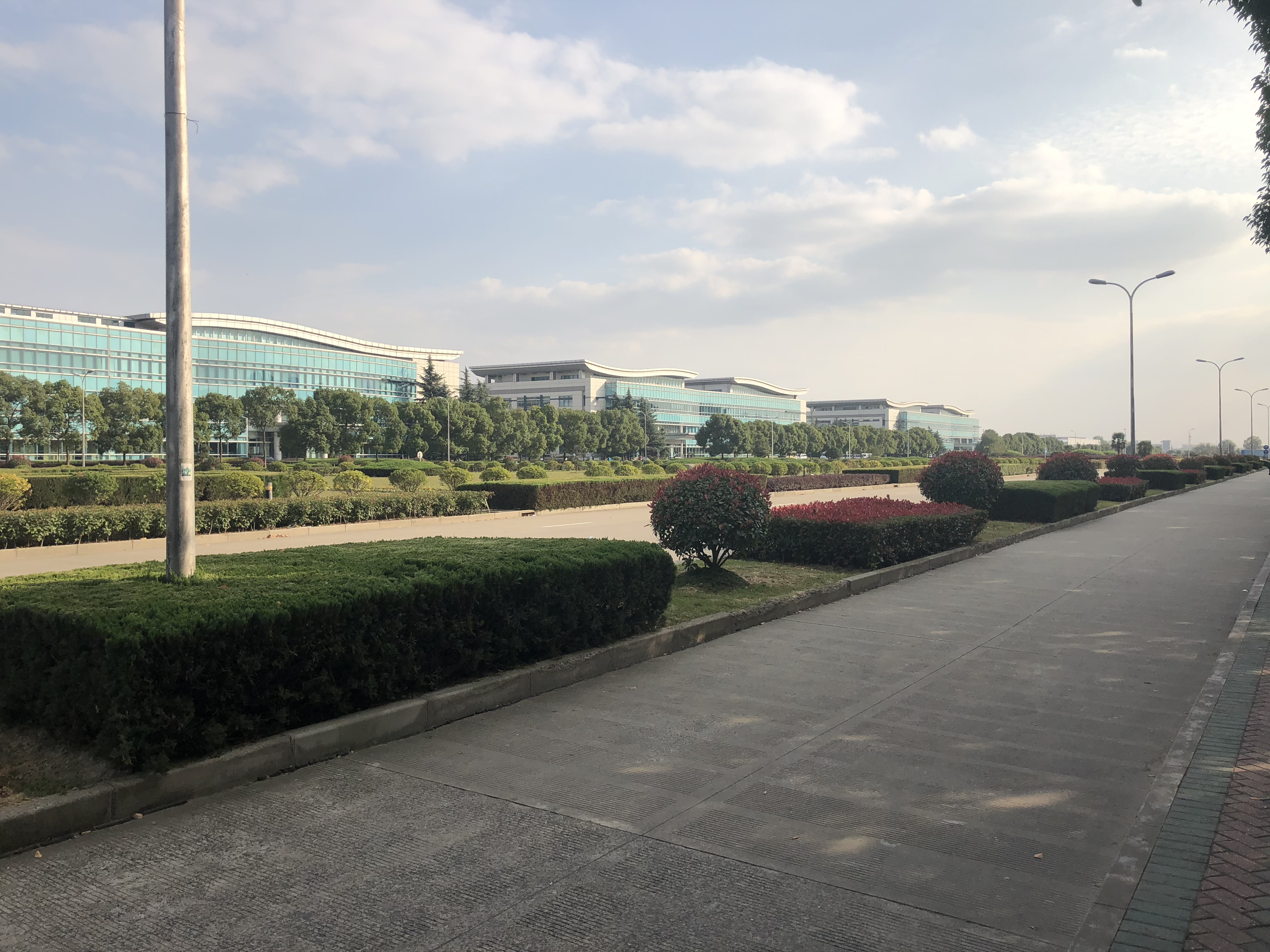
Quanta Shanghai Manufacturing City (QSMC)

=== Shanghai, China (QSMC) ===
This was the first mainland China plant built by Quanta Computer in December 2000 to focus on OEM and ODM production and currently employs nearly 30,000 people. Huangjian Tang, Quanta's Chairman for China, manages seven major plants, F1 to F7, two large warehouses, H1 and H2, and the Q-BUS Research and Development facility.

=== Chongqing, China (QCMC) ===
Constructed in April 2010. Quanta Computer invested and built a plant in Chongqing, China, the third plant built by Quanta Computer in China.

== Court case ==
In 2008, LG Electronics sued Quanta Computer company for patent infringement, when Quanta used Intel components with non-Intel components. The Supreme Court of the United States ruled that LG, who had a patent sharing deal with Intel did not have the right to sue, because Quanta, being a consumer, did not need to abide by patent agreements with Intel and LG.

== See also ==
- List of companies of Taiwan
