= Casio fx-3650P =

Programmable scientific calculator produced by Casio

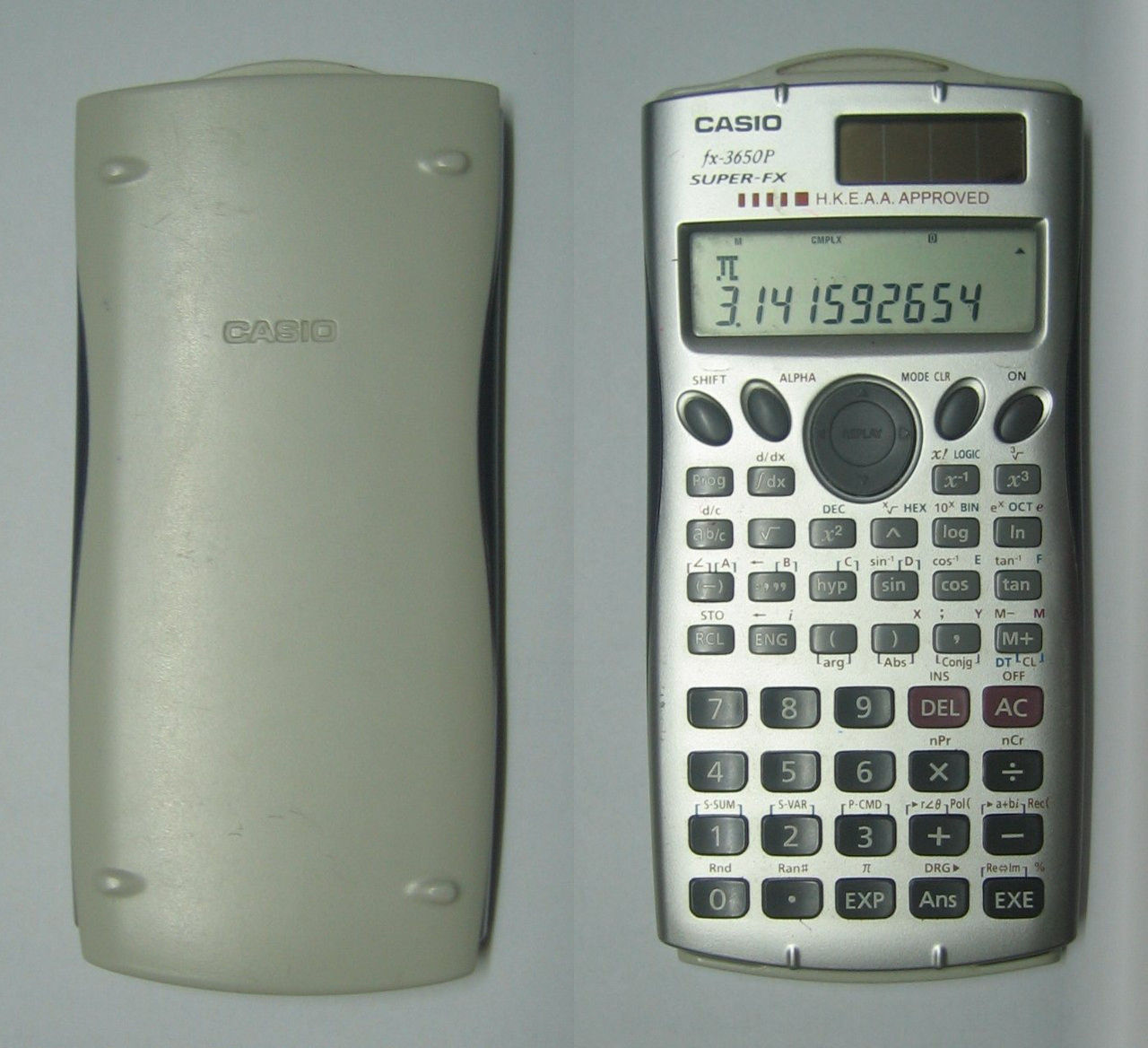
- Type: Scientific calculator
- Manufacturer: Casio
- Introduced: 2002

Calculator
- Entry mode: D.A.L.
- Precision: ±1 at the 10th d.p.
- Display type: 2 line display 1st line-dot matrix 2nd line-LCD

Programming
- Programming language(s): Keystroke

Other
- Power consumption: Solar cell and G13 Type (LR44) button battery two way power

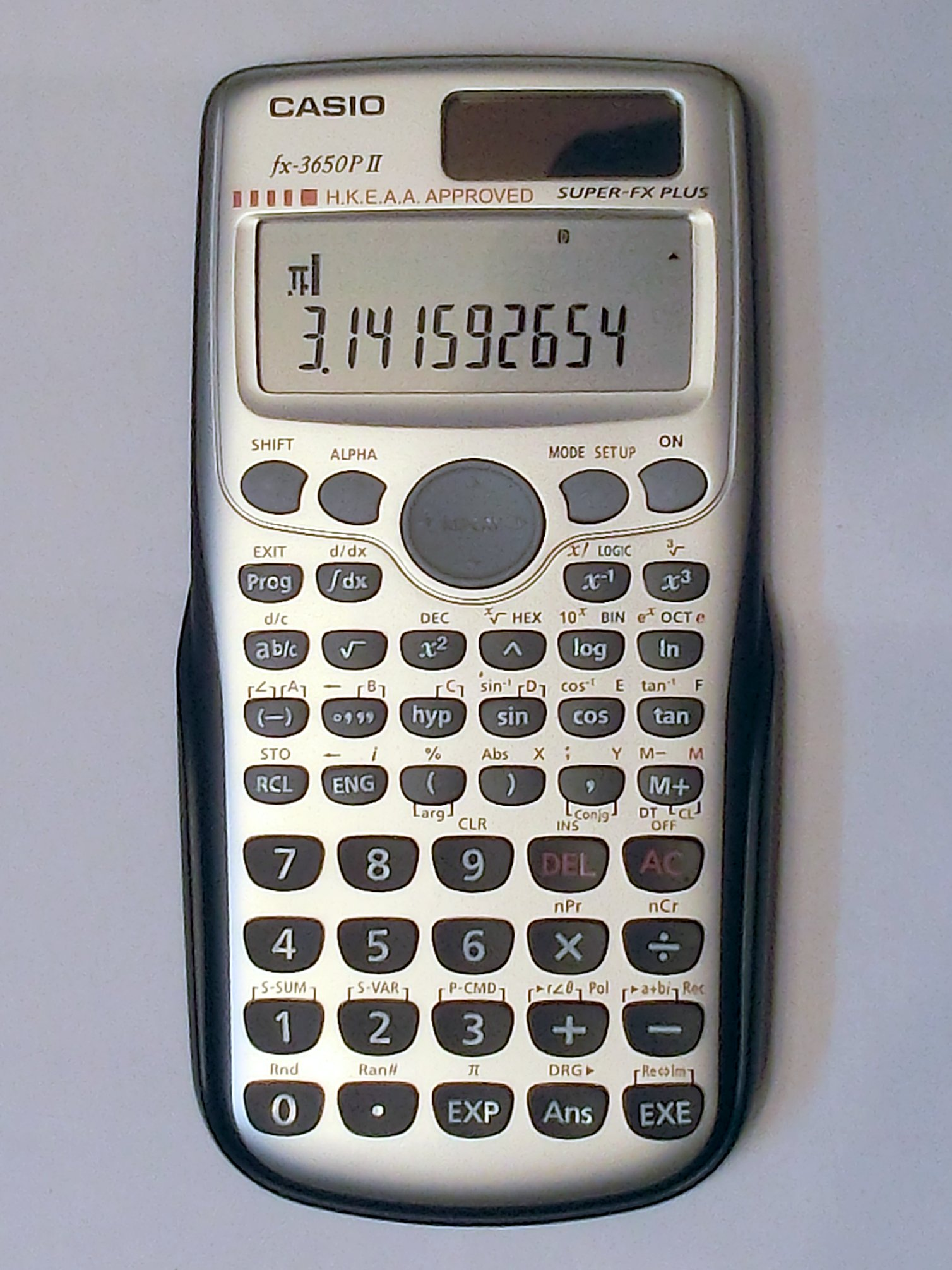
Casio fx-3650P II

Casio fx-3650P is a programmable scientific calculator manufactured by Casio Computer Co., Ltd. It can store twelve digits for the mantissa and two digits for the exponent together with the expression each time the "EXE" button is pressed. Pressing "Ans" also allows the calculator to use the previous result for further calculation as long as the calculator is not turned off after the previous calculation.

== Modes ==
The calculator is available in six modes:

- Basic arithmetic calculations
- Complex number calculations
- Standard deviation calculations
- Regression calculations
- Base-n calculations
- Programs

=== Basic arithmetic calculations ===
- Arithmetic calculations
- Fraction operations
  - Fraction calculations
  - Decimal to fraction conversions
  - Mixed fraction to improper fraction conversions
- Percentage calculations
- Degrees, minutes, seconds calculations
- Rounding (must be used with Fix decimal display mode)
- Trigonometric functions
- Hyperbolic function
- Logarithm
- Natural logarithm
- Antilogarithm
- Differential calculus
- Integral calculus

=== Complex number calculations ===
In this mode, if the result has both real and imaginary parts, an "R↔I" symbol will appear at the top right corner.

- Absolute value and argument calculations
- Rectangular↔polar form display
- Conjugate calculations

=== Standard deviation calculations ===
This mode is for statistical calculation. For some input data, the sum of squares of values (Σx^{2}), sum of values (Σx), number of data (n), sample standard deviation (xσn-1) and population standard deviation (xσn) can be calculated.

=== Regression calculations ===
This mode is for statistical calculation and can be divided further into:

- Linear regression: y=A+Bx
- Logarithmic regression: y=A+B*ln x
- Exponential regression: ln y=ln A+Bx
- Power regression: y=A+x^{B}
- Inverse regression: y=A+B/x
- Quadratic regression: y=A+Bx+Cx^{2}

For some input ordered pairs, one of the below can be calculated. (The availability differs from modes.)

Σx^{2}, Σx, n, Σy^{2}, Σy, Σxy, $\bar{x}$, xσn, xσn-1, $\bar{y}$, yσn, yσn-1, Regression coefficient A, Regression coefficient B, Correlation coefficient r, $\hat{x}$, $\hat{y}$, Σx^{3}, Σx^{2}y, Σx^{4}, Regression coefficient C, $\hat{x}$_{1}and $\hat{x}$_{2}

=== Program ===
The calculator can hold up to four programs with a total capacity of 360 bytes.

Program commands:

- ? – Operator input command, used when user's input is required. Usually used with → (variable)
- → – Assign to variable command, to assign the value before it to the variable after it. Always used as (value)→(variable).
- : – Multi-statement separator, separate program statements
- ◢ – Output command, output the value
- $\Rightarrow$ – Conditional jump, jump when conditions are met
- = – Relational operator
- ≠ – Relational operator
- > – Relational operator
- $\geqq$ – Relational operator
- Goto – Unconditional jump, jump to label, otherwise Lbl
- Lbl – Label, jump destination

==== Conditional jumps ====
Conditional jumps should be used in the syntax:
condition $\Rightarrow$ statement 1 : statement 2
When condition is true, statement 1 is executed, then statement 2 is executed. If condition is false, statement 1 is skipped and statement 2 is executed.

E.g.: ...A=0$\Rightarrow$A+1→B:C+5→D:... If A=0, both A+1→B and C+5→D is executed. If A≠0, only C+5→D is executed.

==== Unconditional jumps ====
Unconditional jumps use Goto and Lbl to operate.

When Goto n (where n is an integer in 0-9) is executed, the program will jump to Lbl n. Loops can be created with unconditional jumps.

== System check ==
The calculator will perform a system check when shift, 7 and ON are pressed together. The system check has three parts.

- Elements check: All display elements are turned on when the system check is initiated. Pressing shift turns the elements off and proceeds to the display check.
- Display check: The dot matrix screen will display "24 PRG13" and the LCD screen will display "0000000000 ^{00}". Pressing shift proceeds by displaying "BBBBBBBBBB" and "1111111111 ^{11}", then "CCCCCCCCCC" and "222222222 ^{22}" and so on up till "JJJJJJJJJJ" and "9999999999 ^{99}". Pressing shift proceeds to the key check.
- Key check: Press shift causes the LCD to display 1. The display increments by 1 for each press of alpha, up, down, left, and right in order. Afterward, pressing MODE, prog, $\textstyle \int$dx, x^{−1}, x^{3}, and so on up till Ans causes the displays to become "24 OK" and "13" upon pressing EXE (the displays differ depending on version, the aforementioned case is for version 4 of the calculator which is the latest version). Pressing ON then ends the system check.
