= FaceVsion =

faceVsion Technology Inc
- Founded: 2009
- Headquarters: Taipei, Taiwan
- Number of employees: 200
- Website: www.facevsion.com

Facevsion, sometimes written faceVsion, was an HD WebCam manufacturer in Taiwan. It reportedly closed some or all of its offices in February 2011.

A related company, faceVsion Technology USA, is or was located in Fremont, California in the United States. FaceVsion Technology specializes in high-definition video communication technology. Their products are often geared towards improving video conferencing experiences, which can include high-definition webcams and related software. The company's specialization in video communication technology is relevant to the current trends in remote work and digital collaboration in the business sector.

== History ==
FaceVsion Technology Inc. was founded in Taipei, Taiwan, in 2009 as a video‑communications subsidiary of notebook original‑design‑manufacturer Quanta Computer.

By late 2010 the company had regional offices in the United States (Fremont, California), Hong Kong and mainland China, and had begun building a European reseller channel.

== Products and technology ==
=== TouchCam series ===
The firm’s first product family was the TouchCam line of high‑definition webcams.

- TouchCam N1 – announced at the 2010 International CES and certified by Skype for 720 p video calling.
- A follow‑up bundle, the FVexpress PCIe card with an external 720 p webcam, was introduced in March 2010 for desktop systems lacking the required H.264 hardware encoding.

All TouchCam models used an on‑board H.264 encoder to off‑load compression from the host CPU, enabling HD calls on mid‑range PCs.

== Reception ==
Early reviews praised the picture quality but criticised the large physical size and Skype‑only focus:

- Laptop Mag described the TouchCam N1 as “one of the first webcams that takes advantage of Skype’s ability to make HD video calls”, awarding it an overall positive verdict while noting its bulk.
- PCWorld highlighted the dual‑microphone array and autofocus lens, but pointed out that compatibility with other chat clients was limited to VGA resolution.
- Benchmark Reviews criticised the webcam’s restricted pan movement yet judged overall performance to be “a strong competitor against any HD webcam”.

== Distribution and partnerships ==
Quanta used existing OEM relationships to position FaceVsion’s products with Skype, Tencent QQ and Google video services. In the UK, audiovisual distributor Imago Group was appointed master‑distributor in 2010, with a broader IT distributor planned for 2011.

== See also ==
- List of companies of Taiwan
- Quanta Computer
- Videotelephony
