= Barry Lam =

Taiwanese businessman

- 林百里
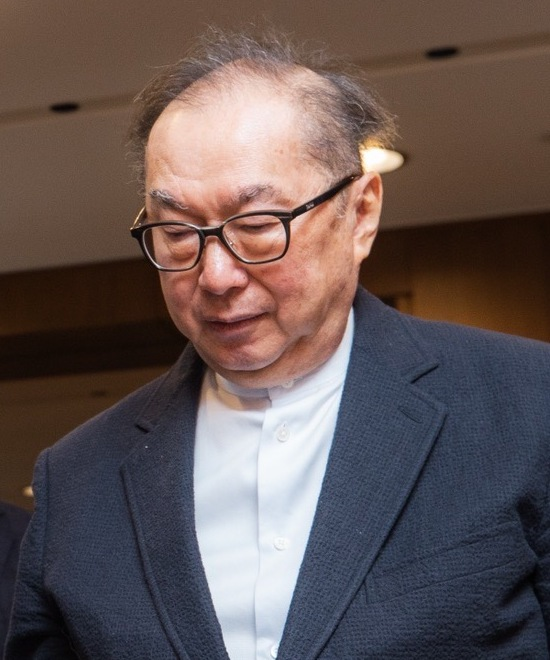
- Lam in 2024
- Born: 24 April 1949 (age 77); Shanghai, China
- Education: National Taiwan University (BS, MS)
- Occupation: Businessman
- Title: Chairman, Quanta Computer
- Children: 2

Lin Pai‑li (Chinese: 林百里; pinyin: Lín Bǎilǐ; Cantonese Yale: Lam4 Baak3 Lei5; born 24 April 1949), also known by his English name Barry Lam, is a Taiwanese billionaire business executive who is the founder and chairman of Quanta Computer. In 2021, the Bloomberg Billionaires Index estimated his net worth at $5.98 billion.

== Life and career ==
Lam was born in Shanghai, China, on April 24, 1949. He was raised in Hong Kong, where his father worked as an accountant for the Hong Kong Club. After high school, Lam attended college in Taiwan. He graduated from National Taiwan University with a Bachelor of Science (B.S.) in electrical engineering in 1970 and a Master of Science (M.S.) in electrical engineering in 1972.

In 1973, Lam and some former classmates founded Kinpo Electronics, a manufacturer of handheld calculators. As the president of the company, Lam built it into the largest contract manufacturer of calculators. In the late 1980s, he became convinced that notebook computers would be the next big product. He left Kinpo and founded Quanta Computer in 1988. He set up Quanta Computer with the help of a colleague, C. C. Leung, with capital of less than US$900,000. It had a turnover of NT$777 billion in 2007 (US$23.7 billion).

In 2006, Fortune Magazine included Quanta in the Fortune Global 500 Companies, and in 2007, Forbes placed Quanta 15th in its ranking of the world's most admired computer companies, the highest of a Taiwanese company. Quanta designs and manufactures for clients such as Apple Inc., Compaq, Dell, Gateway, BlackBerry Ltd., Hewlett-Packard, Alienware, Cisco Systems, Fujitsu, Gericom, Lenovo, LG, Maxdata, MPC, Sharp Corporation, Siemens, Sony, Sun Microsystems, and Toshiba. It is the largest manufacturer of PC notebooks worldwide and has diversified into servers, storage, and liquid-crystal display terminals.

== Quanta ==
Lam established the Quanta Research and Development Center at its headquarters in Taiwan. The center works on many collaborative projects with major institutions such as MIT, National Taiwan University and Academia Sinica on producing next generation products.

== MIT Project T-Party ==
In 2005, Lam and Quanta joined forces with MIT on Project T-Party, a five-year initiative to create the next generation of platforms for computing and communication. The project aims to create new interfaces and explore new ways of managing and accessing information.

== One Laptop per Child ==
Lam decided that Quanta would be the original design manufacturer (ODM) for the OLPC XO-1 by the One Laptop per Child project. Quanta took orders for one million laptops as of 2007-02-15. The OLPC project was also part of Quanta's Blue Ocean Strategy, entering new market segments which are uncontested in terms of competition.

== Arts patronage and philanthropy ==
Lam is one of the foremost patron of the arts in Taiwan. He has a personal collection of more than 1,000 works of art and in particular, he collects Chinese paintings and calligraphy. One of his favourite painters is Zhang Daqian, and he has more than 250 of his works. He is a sponsor of the Zhang Daqian Museum, which is housed in the artist's former home. He has incorporated a Museum of Art and Technology in the headquarters of Quanta in Taiwan, and he displays his personal art collection there.

He is chairman of the Advisory Committee of the National Palace Museum, Taipei, one of the leading museums worldwide. It has the largest collection of Chinese artefacts in the world.

He is chairman of the Contemporary Art Foundation which manages the MoCA Taipei.

He is director of the Cloud Gate Dance Theater group, a Taiwanese modern dance group, which has performed in the Guggenheim Museum in New York, and toured Europe extensively.

He is founder and chairman of the Quanta Cultural and Educational foundation, which promotes culture, art and education in Taiwan. It promotes educational exhibitions and programs for schools free of charge. It has held more than 20 exhibitions in 291 schools, with more than 1.3 million young people participating in its educational activities. The foundation has received the Wen Hsin Golden Award from the Council for Cultural Affairs, Taiwan, for its outstanding promotion of social education many times.

In November 2002, Barry Lam announced that he would fund a new College of Electrical Engineering and Computer Science at his alma mater National Taiwan University. It opened in July 2004, and is known as the Barry Lam Hall. It houses the Barry Lam Art Gallery in its basement.

He is chairman of the Dwen An Social Welfare Foundation, a charitable organisation funded by leading business people in Taiwan.

Barry Lam served as Chairman of the China Exploration & Research Society from 2011 to 2018, for a total of eight years. CERS is a non-profit organization headquartered in Hong Kong, focusing on remote regions of East Asia and Southeast Asia in the areas of exploration, research, conservation of nature and culture, and education. Lam has served as a Director since 2000.

== Honors ==
- 2019 First Class Science and Technology Profession Medal, Ministry of Science and Technology
- 2012 Honorary Doctorate, National Tsing Hua University
- 2007 Honorary Doctorate, National Taiwan University
- 2005 Honorary Degree: Doctor of Technology, The Hong Kong Polytechnic University
- 2006 'Second Class Bright Star Medal' Taiwan Government
- 2006 and 2002 Wen Hsin Silver Award for outstanding promotion of social education, Council of Cultural Affairs, Taiwan
- 2005 Entrepreneur of the Year, Ernst and Young
- 2002 One of '25 Managers of the Year', Business Week Magazine
- 2001 and 1999 One of 'The Stars of Asia', Business Week Magazine
