= Gericom =

Gericom AG
- Type: Public company
- Founded: 1990
- Defunct: 2008
- Headquarters: Linz, Austria
- Key people: Hermann Oberlehner
- Products: Computers, Notebooks
- Revenue: 27,6 million Euro (2008)
- Number of employees: 400 (2008)
- Website: http://www.gericom.com

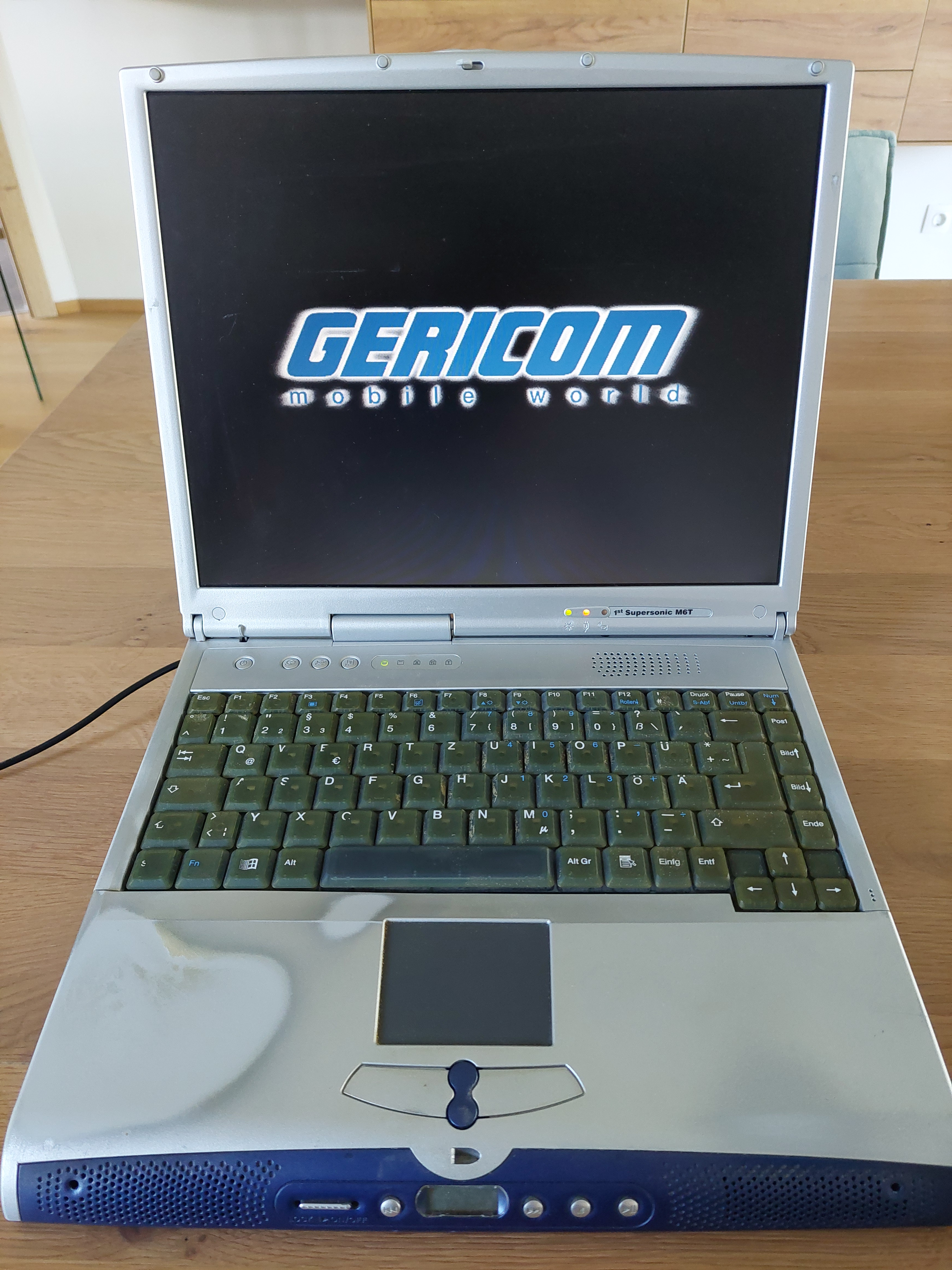
Gericom 1st Supersonic M6T

Gericom was an Austrian computer equipment manufacturer, based in Linz, Upper Austria. Prior to being bought by Taiwan-based Quanmax, Inc in 2008 and subsequently converted to Quanmax AG, the company received investment from the Oberlehner Private Foundation and Charles Dickson, an investor from Hong Kong.

== History ==
The company was founded in 1990 by Hermann Oberlehner and went public as Gericom AG in 2000.

Gericom products were initially sold via chains such as MediaMarkt and Saturn. In 1998 a webshop was established, and later Gericom products were also sold in supermarkets such as Aldi, Hofer, Plus, and Lidl. The company was mostly popular in German-speaking countries of Europe.

In 2004, Gericom planned to sell nearly 25% of its shares to German computer manufacturer Medion, but the deal was later aborted by Gericom's founder Hermann Oberlehner.

Since 2007, sales figures of Gericom products dropped dramatically, issued stocks lost 93% of value between 2003 and 2008. The drastic decrease in sales was often pulled together with quality of Gericom products, that had deteriorated over the years. Gericom products often got very negative test results by computer magazines, often being the last one in comparison tests. In 2008, the annual revenue had dropped to 30 million Euro.

In 2008 the majority of Gericom's company shares (61.32 percent) were sold by Oberlehner and bought by Taiwanese computer manufacturer Quanmax, Inc. Gericom AG was then renamed to Quanmax AG, whose shares continue to be sold at the Frankfurt Stock Exchange in Germany. Quanmax AG experienced significant growth and generated a revenue of about 60 million Euro and employed over 150 people in 2009. Quanmax AG is developing its own products independently from its Taiwanese owner.
