= Quanta Cloud Technology =

QCT
- Type: Subsidiary of Quanta Computer Inc. (TWSE: 2382)
- Industry: Computer hardware and data center services
- Founded: 2012
- Headquarters: Taoyuan, Taiwan
- Area served: Global
- Key people: Mike Yang, General Manager
- Products: servers, storage, network switches, integrated rack systems and integrated cloud solutions
- Services: product configuration, integration, performance optimization and engineering consulting
- Website: www.qct.io

QCT is a provider of data center hardware and cloud solutions that are used by hyperscale data center operators.

QCT sells approximately one out of every seven servers manufactured in the world.

In addition to its headquarters in Taoyuan, Taiwan, QCT has offices in San Jose, Seattle, Beijing, Hangzhou, and Tokyo.

== History ==
The parent company of QCT is Quanta Computer Inc. (Quanta). QCT was established in May 2012 to manufacture servers for end users. In the course of 2012, QCT also added storage hardware and networking switches to its portfolio and became a hardware provider in the cloud market. In 2013 QCT added rack systems to its product portfolio. In 2015 QCT partnered with software vendors to offer software-defined, hyper-converged infrastructure solutions for a variety of cloud environments: public, private, and hybrid. Mike Yang serves as general manager of QCT.

== Research ==
In 2012 QCT became an early contributor to the Open Compute Project (OCP). As an OCP solution provider, QCT designs, builds, and delivers OCP servers for data centers.
